= List of computer algebra systems =

The following tables provide a comparison of computer algebra systems (CAS). A CAS is a package comprising a set of algorithms for performing symbolic manipulations on algebraic objects, a language to implement them, and an environment in which to use the language. A CAS may include a user interface and graphics capability, and to be effective may require a large library of algorithms, efficient data structures, and a fast kernel.

== General ==
System	Creator	Development started	First public release	Latest stable version	Latest stable release date	Cost (USD)	License	Notes
Axiom	Richard Jenks	1977	1993 and 2002		August 2014	Free	modified BSD license	General purpose CAS. Continuous Release using Docker Containers
Cadabra	Kasper Peeters	2001	2007	2.6.0	14 October 2026	Free	GNU GPL	CAS for tensor field theory
CoCoA	John Abbott, Anna M. Bigatti, Giovanni Lagorio	1987	1995	5.2.0	2 May 2017	Free	GNU GPL	Specialized CAS for commutative algebra
Derive	Soft Warehouse	1979	1988	6.1	November 2007	Discontinued	Proprietary	CAS designed for DOS and Windows microcomputers; it was discontinued in 2007
Erable (aka ALGB)	Bernard Parisse, Mika Heiskanen, Claude-Nicolas Fiechter	1993	1993	4.20060919	21 April 2009	Free	LGPL	CAS designed for Hewlett-Packard scientific graphing calculators of the HP 48/49/40/50 series; discontinued in 2009
Fermat	Robert H. Lewis	1986	1993	6.5	21 June 2021	$70 if grant money available, otherwise $0	GNU GPL	Specialized CAS for resultant computation and linear algebra with polynomial entries
FORM	J.A.M. Vermaseren	1984	1989	4.3.1	11 April 2023	Free	GNU GPL	CAS designed mainly for particle physics
FriCAS	Waldek Hebisch	2007	2007	1.4.0	15 October 2026	Free	modified BSD license	Full-featured general purpose CAS. Especially strong at symbolic integration.
GAP	GAP Group	1986	1986	4.16.1	23 August 2026	Free	GNU GPL	Specialized CAS for group theory and combinatorics.
GeoGebra CAS	Markus Hohenwarter et al.		2013	6.0.753.0	3 January 2023	Free for non-commercial use	Freeware	Web-based or Desktop CAS Calculator
GiNaC	Christian Bauer, Alexander Frink, Richard B. Kreckel, et al.	1999	1999	1.8.10	11 February 2026	Free	GNU GPL	Integrate symbolic computation into C++ programs; no high-level interface, but emphasis on interoperability.
GNU Octave	John W. Eaton	1993	1994	11.3.0	1 June 2026	Free	GPLv3+	A high-level programming language for scientific computing and numerical computation mostly compatible with MATLAB
KANT/KASH	KANT Group	?	?	3	2005/2008	Free for non-commercial use	own license	Specialized CAS for algebraic number theory
Macaulay2	Daniel Grayson and Michael Stillman	1992	1994	1.26.05	10 May 2026	Free	GNU GPL	Specialized CAS for algebraic geometry and commutative algebra
Macsyma	MIT Project MAC and Symbolics	1968	1978	2.4	1999	$500	Proprietary	One of the oldest general purpose CAS. Still alive as Maxima.
Magma	University of Sydney	~1990	1993	2.28-19	21 February 2025	$1,440	Proprietary	General purpose CAS, originally specialized in group theory. Works with elements of algebraic structures rather than with non typed mathematical expressions
Magnus	The New York Group Theory Cooperative	1994	1997		2005	Free	GNU GPL	Specialized CAS for group theory providing facilities for doing calculations in and about infinite groups. Discontinued in 2005.
Maple	Symbolic Computation Group, University of Waterloo	1980	1984	2025	25 March 2025	$2,390(Commercial), $2,265 (Government), $995 (Academic), $239 (Personal Edition), $99 (Student), $79 (Student, 12-Month term)	Proprietary	One of the major general purpose CAS
Mathcad	Parametric Technology Corporation	1985	1985	15.0 M045	27 February 2021	$1,600 (Commercial), $105 (Student), Free (Express Edition)	Proprietary	Numerical software with some CAS capabilities
Mathemagix	Joris van der Hoeven	1999	2002			Free	GNU GPL	Computer algebra and analysis system
Mathematica	Wolfram Research	1986	1988	14.3	5 August 2025	$2,495 (Professional), $1,095 (Education), $295 (Personal), $140 (Student), $69.95 (Student annual license), free on Raspberry Pi hardware	Proprietary	One of the major general purpose CAS
Mathics	Mathics3 Development Team	2011	2011			Free	GNU GPL	General-purpose open-source CAS largely compatible with the Wolfram Language.
Mathomatic	George Gesslein II	1986	1987	16.0.5	2012	Discontinued	LGPL	Elementary algebra, calculus, complex number and polynomial manipulations.
Maxima	MIT Project MAC and Bill Schelter et al.	1967	1998	5.50.0	17 August 2026	Free	GNU GPL	General purpose CAS. Continuation of Macsyma; new releases occur approximately two times per year.
MuMATH	Soft Warehouse	1970s	1980	MuMATH-83		Discontinued	Proprietary	Predecessor of Derive
MuPAD	SciFace Software	1989	2008	5.1	2008	Discontinued	Proprietary	MathWorks has incorporated MuPAD technology into Symbolic Math Toolbox
OpenAxiom	Gabriel Dos Reis	2007	2007	1.4.2	2013	Free	modified BSD license	General purpose CAS. A fork of Axiom.
PARI/GP	Henri Cohen, Karim Belabas, Bill Allombert et al.	1985	1990	2.17.4	29 June 2026	Free	GNU GPL	Specialized CAS for number theory.
REDUCE	Anthony C. Hearn	1963	1968	2026-03-08 (March 2026; 8 months ago) [±]	See "Latest stable version".	Free	modified BSD license	One of the oldest and historically important general purpose CAS. Still alive, as open-sourced and freed in December 2008
SageMath	William A. Stein	2005	2005	10.10	28 September 2026	Free	GNU GPL	Mathematics software system combining a number of existing packages, including numerical computation, statistics and image processing
Scilab	Scilab Enterprises	1990	1990	2027.0.0	15 October 2026	Free	CeCILL (GPL-compatible) until version 5.5.2 GPL v2.0 since version 6.0.2	MATLAB alternative.
SINGULAR	University of Kaiserslautern	1984	1997	4.4.1	16 January 2025	Free	GNU GPL	Computer algebra system for polynomial computations, with special emphasis on commutative and non-commutative algebra, algebraic geometry, and singularity theory.
SMath Studio	Andrey Ivashov	2004	2006	1.0.8348	9 November 2022	Free	Proprietary	Mathematical notebook program similar to Mathcad.
Symbolic Manipulation Program	Stephen Wolfram	1979	1981		1988	Discontinued	Proprietary	This software was eventually replaced by Mathematica, and the newer program still retains much of the syntax and functionality of the earlier SMP.
Symbolic Math Toolbox (MATLAB)	MathWorks	1989	2008	2024b	2024	$3,150 (Commercial), $99 (Student Suite), $700 (Academic), $194 (Home) including price of MATLAB.	Proprietary	Provides tools for solving and manipulating symbolic math expressions and performing variable-precision arithmetic.
Symbolics.jl	Shashi Gowda et al.	2020	2021	7.5.0	2026	Free	MIT license	Julia-based
SymPy	Ondřej Čertík	2006	2007	1.14.0	27 April 2025	Free	modified BSD license	Python-based
TI-Nspire CAS (Computer Software)	Texas Instruments	2006	2009	5.1.3	2020		Proprietary	Successor to Derive. Based on Derive's engine used in TI-89/Voyage 200 and TI-Nspire handheld
Wolfram Alpha	Wolfram Research		2009		2013	Pro version: $4.99 / month, Pro version for students: $2.99 / month, ioRegular version: free	Proprietary	Online computer algebra system with step-by step solutions.
Xcas/Giac	Bernard Parisse	2000	2000	2.1.0	13 October 2026	Free	GPL	General CAS, also adapted for the HP Prime. Compatible modes for Maple, MuPAD and TI89 syntax. Symbolic spreadsheets, Giac library for use with other programs. ARM ports for some PDAs with Linux or WinCE
Yacas	Ayal Pinkus et al.	1998	1999	1.9.1	4 July 2020	Free	GNU GPL	
	Creator	Development started	First public release	Latest stable version	Latest stable release date	Cost (USD)	License	Notes

These computer algebra systems are sometimes combined with "front end" programs that provide a better user interface, such as the general-purpose GNU TeXmacs.

=== Functionality ===
Below is a summary of significantly developed symbolic functionality in each of the systems.

System	Formula editor	Arbitrary precision	Calculus		Solvers					Graph theory	Number theory	Quantifier elimination	Boolean algebra	Tensors	Probability	Control theory	Group theory
System	Formula editor	Arbitrary precision	Integration	Integral transforms	Equations	Inequalities	Diophantine equations	Differential equations	Recurrence relations	Graph theory	Number theory	Quantifier elimination	Boolean algebra	Tensors	Probability	Control theory	Group theory
Axiom	No	Yes	Yes	Yes	Yes	Yes	Yes	Yes	Yes	No	Yes	Yes	Yes	Yes	Yes	No	Yes
Cadabra	No	Yes	Yes	Yes	Yes	Yes	No	Yes	No	No	No	No	No	Yes	No	No	Yes
FriCAS	Yes	Yes	Yes	Yes	Yes	Yes	Yes	Yes	Yes	Yes	Yes	Yes	Yes	Yes	Yes	No	Yes
GAP	No	Yes	No	No	Yes	Yes	Yes	No	Yes	Yes	Yes	Yes	Yes	Yes	No	No	Yes
GNU Octave	Yes	Yes	Yes	?	Yes	Yes	?	Yes	?	?	?	?	Yes	?	Yes	Yes	?
Magma	No	Yes	No	No	Yes	No	Yes	No	No	Yes	Yes	No	No	No	?	?	Yes
Magnus	No	Yes	No	No	No	No	No	No	No	?	?	No	?	No	No	No	Yes
Maple	Yes	Yes	Yes	Yes	Yes	Yes	Yes	Yes	Yes	Yes	Yes	Yes	Yes	Yes	Yes	Yes	Yes
Mathcad	Yes	No	Yes	No	Yes	No	No	No	No	No	No	No	No	No	No	No	No
Mathematica	Yes	Yes	Yes	Yes	Yes	Yes	Yes	Yes	Yes	Yes	Yes	Yes	Yes	Yes	Yes	Yes	Yes
Mathics	Yes	Yes	Yes	No	Yes	Yes	No	Yes	No	No	Yes	No	Yes	Yes	No	No	No
Mathomatic	No	No	Yes	Yes	Yes	No	No	No	No	No	Yes	No	No	No	No	No	No
Maxima	No	Yes	Yes	Yes	Yes	Yes	No	Yes	Yes	Yes	Yes	No	Yes	Yes	Yes	Yes	Yes
PARI/GP	No	Yes	Yes	No	Yes	No	Yes*	No	Yes*	No	Yes	No	Yes	?	?	No	Yes
REDUCE	Yes	Yes	Yes	Yes	Yes	Yes	No	Yes	No	No	Yes	Yes	Yes	Yes	No	No	No
SageMath	No	Yes	Yes	Yes	Yes	Yes	Yes^{[A]}	Yes	Yes	Yes	Yes	Yes^{[B]}	Yes	Yes	Yes	No	Yes
Scilab	Yes	Yes	Yes	?	Yes	Yes	?	Yes	?	?	?	?	Yes	?	Yes	Yes	?
SMath Studio	Yes	No	Yes	No	Yes	No	No	No	No	No	No	No	No	No	No	No	No
Symbolic Math Toolbox (MATLAB)	Yes	Yes	Yes	Yes	Yes	Yes	Yes	Yes	No	Yes	Yes	No	Yes	No	Yes	Yes	No
SymPy	No	Yes	Yes	Yes	Yes	Yes	Yes	Yes	Yes	No	Yes	No	Yes	Yes	Yes	No	Yes
Wolfram Alpha	Yes	Yes	Yes	Yes	Yes	Yes	Yes	Yes	Yes	Yes	Yes	Yes	Yes	No	?	?	Yes
Xcas/Giac	Yes	Yes	Yes	No	Yes	Yes	No	Yes	Yes	No	Yes	No	No	No	Yes	?	?
Yacas	No	Yes	Yes	No	Yes	No	No	No	No	No	No	No	No	No	?	?	No

1. via SymPy
2. via qepcad optional package

Those which do not "edit equations" may have a GUI, plotting, ASCII graphic formulae and math font printing. The ability to generate plaintext files is also a sought-after feature because it allows a work to be understood by people who do not have a computer algebra system installed.

=== Operating system support ===
The software can run under their respective operating systems natively without emulation. Some systems must be compiled first using an appropriate compiler for the source language and target platform. For some platforms, only older releases of the software may be available.

System	DOS	Windows	macOS	Linux	BSD	Solaris	Android	iOS	SaaS	Other
Axiom	?	Emulator	Yes	Yes	No	No	?	?	No	
Cadabra	No	Yes	Yes	Yes	Yes	No	No	No	Yes	
CoCoA	No	Yes	Yes	Yes	Yes	Yes	?	?	No	Tru64 UNIX, HP-UX, IRIX
Derive	Yes	Yes	No	No	No	No	No	No	No	
Erable	No	Emulator	Emulator	Emulator	No	No	No	No	No	System RPL on HP 48/49/50/40 series
Euler	?	Yes	No	Yes	No	No	?	?	No	
Fermat	?	Cygwin	Yes	Yes	No	No	?	?	No	
FORM	?	Cygwin	Yes	Yes	Yes	Yes	?	?	No	
FriCAS	?	Cygwin+native	Yes	Yes	Yes	Yes	Yes	?	No	
GAP	?	Yes	Yes	Yes	Yes	Yes	?	?	No	
KANT/KASH	?	Yes	Yes	Yes	No	No	?	?	No	
Macaulay2	?	Cygwin	Yes	Yes	Yes	Yes	?	?	No	
Magma	?	Yes	Yes	Yes	Yes	Yes	?	?	No	
Magnus	No	Yes	?	Yes	?	Yes	No	No	No	SunOs
Maple	No	Yes	Yes	Yes	No	No	No	No	No	
Mathcad	Yes	Yes	No	No	No	No	No	No	No	
Mathematica	Yes	Yes	Yes	Yes	Some	No	Some	Some	Yes	Raspberry Pi
Mathics	No	Yes	Yes	Yes	No	?	No	No	No	Runs anywhere Python runs; browser notebook via JupyterLite
Mathomatic	Yes	Yes	Yes	Yes	Yes	Yes	No	Yes	No	All POSIX platforms
Maxima	?	Yes	Yes	Yes	Yes	Yes	Yes	?	No	All POSIX platforms with Common Lisp
MuMATH	Yes	No	No	No	No	No	?	?	No	
OpenAxiom	?	Yes	Yes	Yes	Yes	Yes	?	?	No	
PARI/GP	?	Yes	Yes	Yes	Yes	Yes	Yes	?	No	
REDUCE	No	Yes	Yes	Yes	Yes	Yes	Yes	Yes	No	
SageMath	No	Yes	Yes	Yes	No	Yes	No	Yes	Yes	
SINGULAR	?	Yes	Yes	Yes	Yes	Yes	?	?	No	
SMath Studio	No	Yes	Mono	Mono	Mono	Mono	Yes	Yes	Yes	Universal Windows Platform
Symbolic Math Toolbox (MATLAB)	No	Yes	Yes	Yes	No	No	No	No	Yes	
SymbolicC++	?	Yes	Yes	Yes	Yes	Yes	?	?	No	
SymPy	?	Yes	Yes	Yes	Yes	Yes	Yes	Yes	Yes	Any system that supports Python
TI-Nspire (desktop software)	No	Yes	Yes	No	No	No	No	Yes	No	
Xcas/Giac	No	Yes	Yes	Yes	Yes	Yes	Yes	Yes	No	HP Prime CAS, KhiCAS for TI Nspire
Yacas	No	Yes	Yes	Yes	Yes	Yes	?	?	No	

== Graphing calculators ==
Some graphing calculators have CAS features.

System	Creator	Development started	First public release / OS version	Latest stable version / OS version	Notes
Casio CFX-9970G	CASIO Computer Co.	?	1998		
Casio Algebra FX 2.0, Casio Algebra FX 2.0 Plus	CASIO Computer Co.	?	1999		
Casio ClassPad 300, Casio ClassPad 300 Plus, Casio ClassPad 330, Casio ClassPad 330 Plus, Casio ClassPad fx-CP400, Casio fx-CG500 Casio ClassPad Manager	CASIO Computer Co.	2002	2003	3.10.7000 (ClassPad I) 2.01.7000 (ClassPad II, fx-CG500)	ClassPad Manager is an emulator which runs on a PC.
HP 49G, HP 49g+, HP 48gII, HP 50g, HP 40G, HP 40gs	Hewlett-Packard	1993	1.??(1999) / 4	2.15 (2006-09-19, 2009-04-21) / 4	Based on Erable, which is also available as an add-on for the HP 48S, HP 48SX, HP 48G, HP 48G+, HP 48GX. Intended for problems which occur in engineering applications. Source code openly available.
HP Prime	Hewlett-Packard	2000	2013	2.1.14433 (2020 01 21) CAS ver. 1.5.0	Based on Xcas/Giac. Xcas source code openly available, but not HP Prime implementation.
TI-89	Texas Instruments	1995	1996	2.09	
TI-89 Titanium	Texas Instruments	2003	2004	7/18/2005 v3.10	
TI-92	Texas Instruments	1994	1995	?	
TI-92 Plus	Texas Instruments	1997	1998	3/27/2003 v2.09	
TI-Nspire CAS, TI-Nspire CX CAS, TI-Nspire CX II CAS	Texas Instruments	2006	2008	2021 v4.5.5.79 (For TI-Nspire CX CAS), 2022 v5.4.0.259 (For TI-Nspire CX II CAS)	
Voyage 200	Texas Instruments	2001	2002	7/18/2005 v3.10	

== See also ==
- Category:Computer algebra systems
- Comparison of statistical packages
- List of information graphics software
- List of numerical-analysis software
- List of numerical libraries
- List of open-source mathematical libraries
- List of statistical software
- Mathematical software
- Web-based simulation
