= LiveMath =

Computer algebra system

- LiveMath screen snap showing the (busy) palette and a simple worksheet with a graph of $x=y^2$
- Developer(s): Theorist Interactive, LLC (1999-2004, 3.0-3.5.6); MathMonkeys, LLC (2004-, 3.5.7-)
- Stable release: 3.6.0 / January 2017
- Operating system: Mac OS X 10.4, Microsoft Windows XP, Linux (i386 Ubuntu 11.04, Redhat Linux, CentOS)
- Platform: Cross-platform
- Type: Computer algebra system
- License: Proprietary
- Website: www.livemath.com

LiveMath is a computer algebra system available on a number of platforms including Mac OS, macOS (Carbon), Microsoft Windows, Linux (x86) and Solaris (SPARC). It is the latest release of a system that originally emerged as Theorist for the "classic" Mac in 1989, became MathView and MathPlus in 1997 after it was sold to Waterloo Maple, and finally LiveMath after it was purchased by members of its own userbase in 1999. The application is currently owned by MathMonkeys of Cambridge, Massachusetts. The overall LiveMath suite contains LiveMath Maker, the main application, as well as LiveMath Viewer for end-users, and LiveMath Plug-In, an ActiveX plugin for browsers, which was discontinued in 2014.

== Description ==
LiveMath uses a worksheet-based approach, similar to products like Mathematica or MathCAD. The user enters equations into the worksheet and then uses the built-in functions to help solve them, or reduce them numerically. Workbooks typically contain a number of equations separated into sections, along with data tables, graphs, and similar outputs. Unlike most CAS applications, LiveMath uses a full GUI with high-quality graphical representations of the equations at every step, including input.

LiveMath also allows the user to interact with the equation in the sheet; for instance, one can drag an instance of $x$ to the left hand side of the equation, at which point LiveMath will re-arrange the equation to solve for $x$. LiveMath's algebraic solving systems are relatively simple compared to better known systems like Mathematica, and does not offer the same sort of automated single-step solving of these packages.

== See also ==
- Comparison of computer algebra systems
