= SymPy =

Python library for symbolic computation

- Developer: SymPy Development Team
- Release: 2007; 19 years ago
- Stable release: 1.14.0 / 27 April 2025; 17 months ago
- Written in: Python
- Operating system: Cross-platform
- Type: Computer algebra system
- License: 3-clause BSD
- Website: www.sympy.org
- Repository: github.com/sympy/sympy

SymPy is an open-source Python library for symbolic computation. It provides computer algebra capabilities either as a standalone application, as a library to other applications, or live on the web as SymPy Live or SymPy Gamma. SymPy is simple to install and to inspect because it is written entirely in Python with few dependencies. This ease of access combined with a simple and extensible codebase in a well-known language makes SymPy a computer algebra system with a relatively low barrier to entry.

SymPy includes features ranging from basic symbolic arithmetic to calculus, algebra, discrete mathematics, and quantum physics. It is capable of formatting the result of the computations as LaTeX code.

SymPy is free software and is licensed under the 3-clause BSD. The lead developers are Ondřej Čertík and Aaron Meurer. It was started in 2005 by Ondřej Čertík.

== Features ==
The SymPy library is split into a core with many optional modules.

Currently, the core of SymPy has around 260,000 lines of code (it also includes a comprehensive set of self-tests: over 100,000 lines in 350 files as of version 0.7.5), and its capabilities include:

=== Core capabilities ===
- Basic arithmetic: *, /, +, -, **
- Simplification
- Expansion
- Functions: trigonometric, hyperbolic, exponential, roots, logarithms, absolute value, spherical harmonics, factorials and gamma functions, zeta functions, polynomials, hypergeometric, special functions, etc.
- Substitution
- Arbitrary precision integers, rationals and floats
- Noncommutative symbols
- Pattern matching

=== Polynomials ===
- Basic arithmetic: division, gcd, etc.
- Factorization
- Square-free factorization
- Gröbner bases
- Partial fraction decomposition
- Resultants

=== Calculus ===
- Limits
- Differentiation
- Integration: Implemented Risch–Norman heuristic
- Taylor series (Laurent series)

=== Solving equations ===
- Systems of linear equations
- Systems of algebraic equations that are solvable by radicals
- Differential equations
- Difference equations

=== Discrete math ===
- Binomial coefficients
- Summations
- Products
- Number theory: generating Prime numbers, primality testing, integer factorization, etc.
- Logic expressions

=== Matrices ===
- Basic arithmetic
- Eigenvalues and their eigenvectors when the characteristic polynomial is solvable by radicals
- Determinants
- Inversion
- Solving

=== Geometry ===
- Points, lines, rays, ellipses, circles, polygons, etc.
- Intersections
- Tangency
- Similarity

=== Plotting ===
Note, plotting requires the external Matplotlib or Pyglet module.

- Coordinate models
- Plotting Geometric Entities
- 2D and 3D
- Interactive interface
- Colors
- Animations

=== Physics ===
- Units
- Classical mechanics
- Continuum mechanics
- Quantum mechanics
- Gaussian optics
- Linear control

=== Statistics ===
- Normal distributions
- Uniform distributions
- Probability

=== Combinatorics ===
- Permutations
- Combinations
- Partitions
- Subsets
- Permutation group: Polyhedral, Rubik, Symmetric, etc.
- Prufer sequence and Gray codes

=== Printing ===
- Pretty-printing: ASCII/Unicode pretty-printing, LaTeX
- Code generation: C, Fortran, Python

== Related projects ==
- SageMath: an open source alternative to Mathematica, Maple, MATLAB, and Magma (SymPy is included in Sage)
- SymEngine: a rewriting of SymPy's core in C++, in order to increase its performance. Work is currently in progress to make SymEngine the underlying engine of Sage too.
- SymPy Editor: a graphical user interface to edit SymPy expressions, available as Jupyter widget, stand-alone webserver, Android and iOS app.
- mpmath: a Python library for arbitrary-precision floating-point arithmetic
- SympyCore: another Python computer algebra system
- SfePy: Software for solving systems of coupled partial differential equations (PDEs) by the finite element method in 1D, 2D and 3D.
- GAlgebra: Geometric algebra module (previously sympy.galgebra).
- Quameon: Quantum Monte Carlo in Python.
- Lcapy: Experimental Python package for teaching linear circuit analysis.
- LaTeX Expression project: Easy LaTeX typesetting of algebraic expressions in symbolic form with automatic substitution and result computation.
- Symbolic statistical modeling: Adding statistical operations to complex physical models.
- Diofant: a fork of SymPy, started by Sergey B Kirpichev

== Dependencies ==
Since version 1.0, SymPy has the mpmath package as a dependency.

There are several optional dependencies that can enhance its capabilities:

- gmpy: If gmpy is installed, SymPy's polynomial module will automatically use it for faster ground types. This can provide a several times boost in performance of certain operations.
- matplotlib: If matplotlib is installed, SymPy can use it for plotting.
- Pyglet: Alternative plotting package.

== See also ==
- Comparison of computer algebra systems
- List of open-source mathematical libraries
