= Yacas =

Computer algebra system

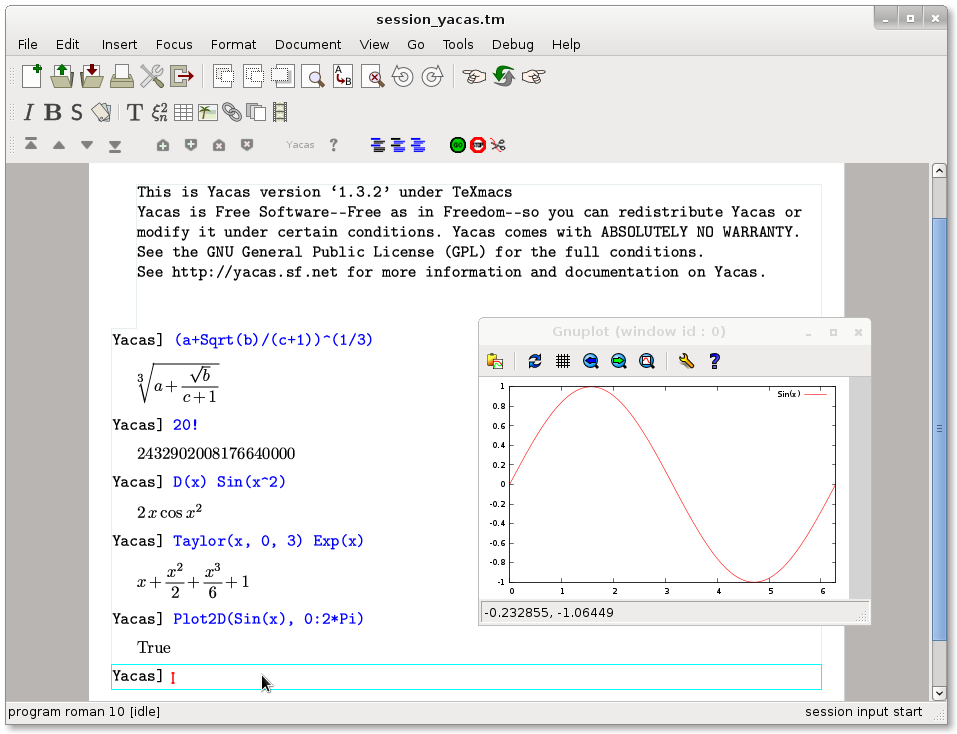
- Yacas as a TeXmacs session
- Developers: Ayal Z. Pinkus, Serge Winitzki et al.
- Release: 1999; 27 years ago
- Stable release: 1.9.1 / 4 July 2020; 6 years ago
- Written in: C++
- Operating system: Cross-platform
- Type: Computer algebra system
- License: LGPLv2.1+
- Website: www.yacas.org
- Repository: github.com/grzegorzmazur/yacas

Yacas /ˈjækəs/ is a general-purpose computer algebra system. The name is an acronym for Yet Another Computer Algebra System.

Released under the GNU Lesser General Public License, Yacas is free software.

YACAS is a program for symbolic manipulation of mathematical expressions. It uses its own programming language designed for symbolic as well as arbitrary-precision numerical computations. The system has a library of scripts that implement many of the symbolic algebra operations; new algorithms can be easily added to the library. YACAS comes with extensive documentation covering the scripting language, the functionality that is already implemented in the system, and the algorithms used. Its development started in early 1999.

Yacas handles input and output in plain ASCII or in OpenMath, either interactively or in batch mode.

== See also ==
- Comparison of computer algebra systems
