= V200 =

V200 or V-200 may refer to:

- DB Class V 200, a diesel-hydraulic locomotive used by the German railway Deutsche Bundesbahn
- ESP LTD V-200, a guitar model manufactured by ESP
- UMS Skeldar V-200, a Swedish uncrewed military helicopter
- V-200, a variant of the Cadillac Gage Commando armoured personnel carrier
- Voyage 200, a design in the TI-92 series calculators
