= Cadabra (computer program) =

Computer algebra system

- Developer(s): Kasper Peeters
- Stable release: 2.5.14 / 31 July 2025; 0 days ago
- Repository: github.com/kpeeters/cadabra2
- Written in: C++, Python
- Operating system: Linux, macOS, Microsoft Windows
- Type: Computer algebra system
- License: GPL
- Website: cadabra.science

Cadabra is a computer algebra system designed specifically for the solution of problems encountered in classical field theory, quantum field theory and string theory.

The first version of Cadabra was developed around 2001 for computing higher-derivative string theory correction to supergravity.

Released under the GNU General Public License, Cadabra is free software.

Cadabra has extensive functionality for tensor polynomial simplification including multi-term symmetries, fermions and anti-commuting variables, Clifford algebras and Fierz transformations, implicit coordinate dependence, multiple index types and many more. The input format is a subset of TeX. Both a command-line and a graphical interface are available.

A Java program inspired by Cadabra called Redberry was developed between 2013 and 2016. It achieved faster speeds for most index contractions with an approach based on the graph isomorphism problem rather than canonicalisation.

== See also ==
- List of computer algebra systems
