= Casio ClassPad 300 =

Family of graphing calculators by Casio

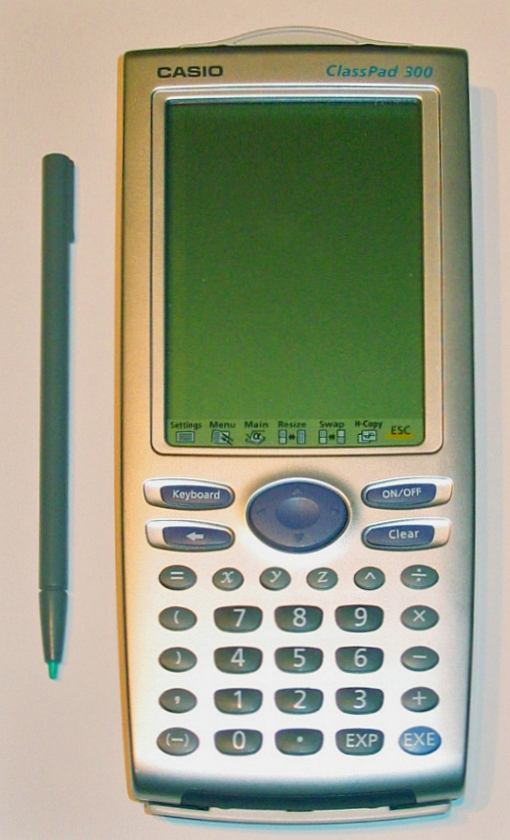
- Type: Programmable Graphing
- Manufacturer: Casio

Calculator
- Entry mode: V.P.A.M.
- Display type: LCD Dot-matrix
- Display size: 160×240 dots

CPU
- Processor: SuperH 3

Programming
- Programming language(s): BASIC-like

The Casio ClassPad 300, ClassPad 330 and fx-CP400 are stylus based touch-screen graphing calculators. It comes with a collection of applications that support self-study, like 3D Graph, Geometry, eActivity, Spreadsheet, etc. A large 160x240 pixel LCD touch screen enables stylus-based operation. It resembles Casio's earlier Pocket Viewer line. HP and Texas Instruments attempted to release similar pen based calculators (the HP Xpander and PET Project (see TI PLT SHH1), but both were cancelled before release to the market.

The ClassPad 300 allows input of expressions, and displays them as they appear in a textbook. Factorization of expressions, calculation of limit values of functions, and other operations can be performed while viewing the results on a large LCD screen. It also comes with graphing tools for 3D graphing and drawing of geometric figures.

The user interface features a pull-down menu format. Solutions, expressions, and other items can be selected with the tap of the stylus. Drag and drop, copy and paste, and other pen-based operations, are also supported. An eActivity application allows the creation of so-called eActivities, which can include figures, expressions, and explanations.

In the United States the ClassPad series is banned from standardized tests including the SAT, the ACT, and the AP Calculus test, due to its virtual QWERTY keyboard and stylus usage.

In 2017, the fx-CG500 was released, targeted towards the North American market. While almost entirely identical to the fx-CP400, its removal of the QWERTY keyboards means it is included in the list of allowed calculators on American standardized exams, including AP and SAT.

== History ==
During 1996, CASIO worked on the CAS (Computer Algebra System) and studying Geometry. The CAS was first used in the Casio CFX-9970G then the Casio Algebra FX 2.0, and later formed the core math system for the ClassPad.

In 1999, the idea of the eActivity emerged. It was intended to allow all applications to interact from within one application, and display information in a textbook style.

In 2000, CASIO opened a new office, the CASIO Education Technology M.R.D. Center in Portland, Oregon, USA. They hired many engineers, and started to implement more features.

In 2002, CASIO completed a prototype for the ClassPad. Before the prototype was complete, an emulator was used for testing. The emulator was later included in the software that was being developed for data transfer. The data transfer and emulator software later merged into one product called the ClassPad Manager.

In 2003 and 2005, CASIO released respectively their first and second product: the ClassPad 300 with 4.5 MB of flash memory, and the ClassPad 300 Plus with 5.4 MB of flash memory and other improvements.

=== ClassPad OS 3.0 ===
ClassPad Manager 3.0 Software

In 2006 CASIO released OS 3.0 for the ClassPad. OS 3.0 featured Laplace and Fourier transformation, differential equation graphs, financial functions, AP statistics and parameterized 3D graphs. Subsequent releases were only available for users with OS 3.0 or later.

Later in 2006 & 2007 CASIO released OS 3.01 and 3.02, concentrating solely on bug fixing. The 2007 ClassPad was called the 330 series, but was distinguished from the 300 plus only by its having OS 3.02 pre-installed.

In 2008 CASIO released OS 3.03 for the ClassPad. OS 3.03 featured new probability distribution functions, an extended numeric solver and several user interface improvements. The corresponding hardware with this OS installed was the 330-A series

In 2009 CASIO released OS 3.04 for the ClassPad. OS 3.04 featured an updated spreadsheet application, stat function enhancements and several user interface improvements. Also, there were two hotfix releases for OS 3.04.3000 - namely: OS 3.04.4000 and OS 3.04.5000

In 2010 CASIO released OS 3.05 for the ClassPad. OS 3.05 featured new financial functions and an 'on data' option for quartile calculation.

In 2011 CASIO released OS 3.06 for the ClassPad. OS 3.06 featured new imaginary calculation functions and an improved numeric solver. So far, four hotfixs release followed with the latest being 3.06.4000.

In 2012 CASIO released the ClassPad 330 Plus featuring a faster CPU (SuperH 4) and the calculator is now treated as a regular USB mass storage device.

In December 2018 Casio released 3.10.7000 for the ClassPad 330 Plus. Adding improvements in calculation precision.

== fx-CP400 ==
Casio ClassPad II fx-CP400
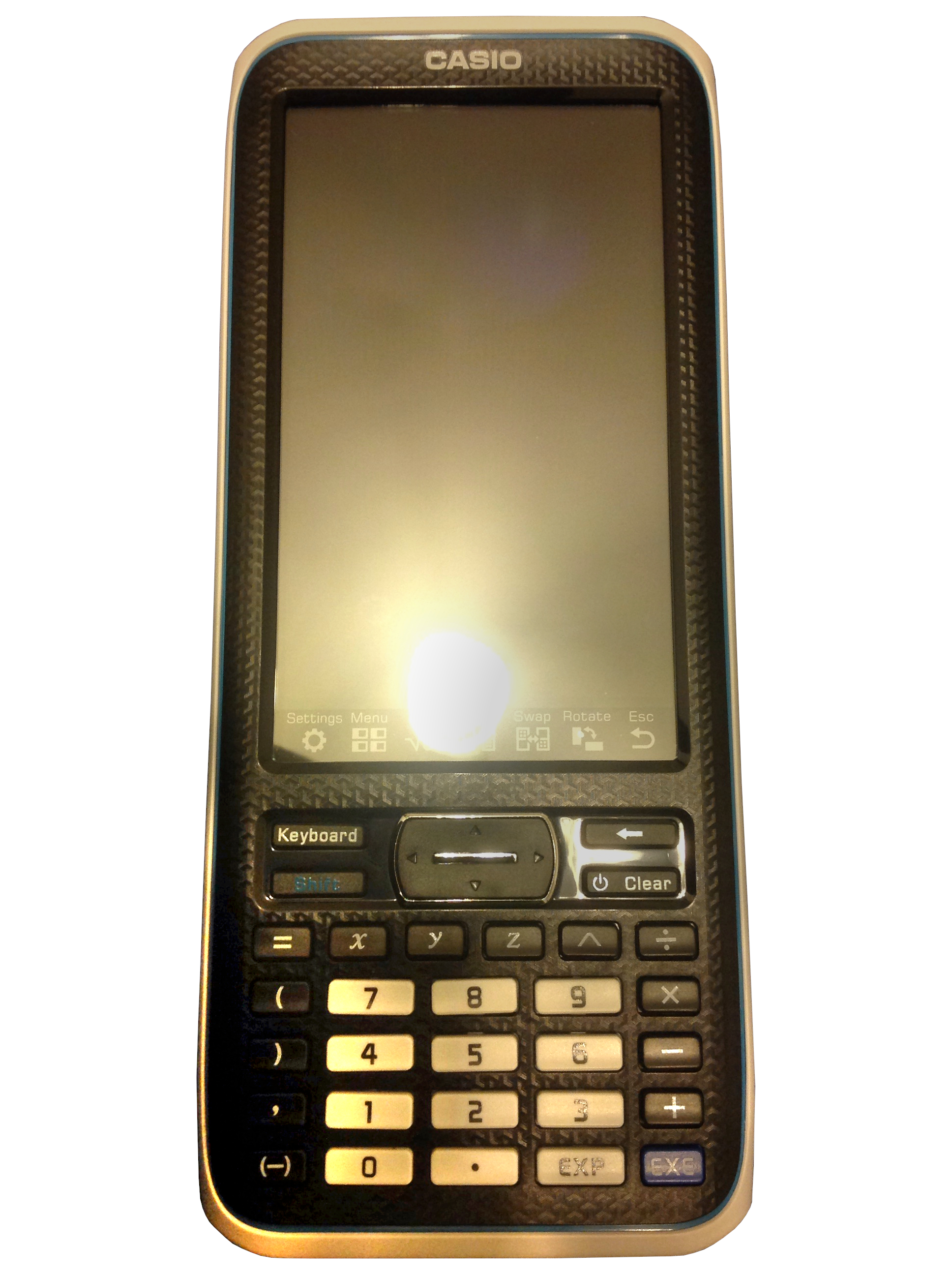
- Type: Programmable
- Introduced: 2013
- Latest firmware: 2.01.7000.0000
- Predecessor: ClassPad 330 Plus
- Cost: ~$150 USD

Calculator
- Entry mode: V.P.A.M.
- Precision: 15 digits (typical display); 611 digits (for integers, maximum length that can be stored exactly); 15 decimal digits 1000 digits (maximum)
- Display type: Color LCD
- Display size: 320 × 528 (4.8 inch)

CPU
- Processor: SuperH 4 (SH7305)

Programming
- Programming language(s): BASIC-like, often called Casio-BASIC
- User memory: 512 KB (included in RAM)
- External memory: 24 MB (storage); 5.5 MB (eActivity)
- Memory register: 2 MB (512 KB available to user)

Interfaces
- Connection: USB; 3pin data communication
- Connects to: Computer via: USB; Other fx-CP400s via: 3pin cable (up to 115.2 kilobits / second)

Other
- Power supply: 4 AAA alkaline or nickel-metal hydride batteries
- Power consumption: 1.0 W
- Weight: 315 grams
- Dimensions: 8.9 cm (W); 20.6 cm (D); 2.11 cm (H)

The fx-CP400, released in 2013, has a colour screen also capable of switching the screen between portrait and landscape views. The resolution was also improved, to 320 × 528 pixels.

The CPU is a SuperH 4 of the SH-7305 model. It contains a 2MB RAM chip, but only 512KB are available to the user. It includes 24 MB of flash storage, and 5.5 MB for eActivity.

On this calculator, integers can be stored up to 2^{2032}, which is 611 digits long. After that, scientific notation is used to represent numbers up to 10^{1000}.

== fx-CG500 ==
The Casio fx-CG500 was introduced in 2017, and is almost identical to the fx-CP400. The most significant difference is that its virtual keyboard is stuck in alphabetical (ABC) layout, as opposed to the fx-CP400's option to switch between QWERTY, German QWERTZ and alphabetical layout. Due to this, it is now included in the list of authorised models in American SAT and AP exams.

It has a grey-colored appearance, as opposed to the fx-CP400's black on white design.

== Programming ==
The calculators can be programmed in two ways. The Classpad comes with Casio BASIC, a built-in BASIC-like interpreted language, allowing the user to create programs using built-in functionality.

The other method is to create an add-in. Add-ins are binary programs, executing directly on the calculator's CPU. Casio/Saltire has released an SDK, allowing users to create their own add-ins, though no support is provided for this by Casio. The SDK is available for registered users at Casio's website. Currently there is no SDK version compatible with the new Classpad 330 Plus or the fx-CP400.

After the release of the SDK, a Lua interpreter plugin (CPlua) was created. This add-in allows users to develop programs and games in Lua.

== See also ==
- TI-Nspire - some models have touchpad and CAS
- TI-92 series - CAS and qwerty keyboard
- TI-89 series - CAS
- HP-49 series - CAS
- HP Xpander (project was canceled) - It had both a keyboard and a pen-based interface but no CAS
- HP Prime - touchpad and CAS
