= HP Xpander =

Cancelled Hewlett-Packard graphing calculator

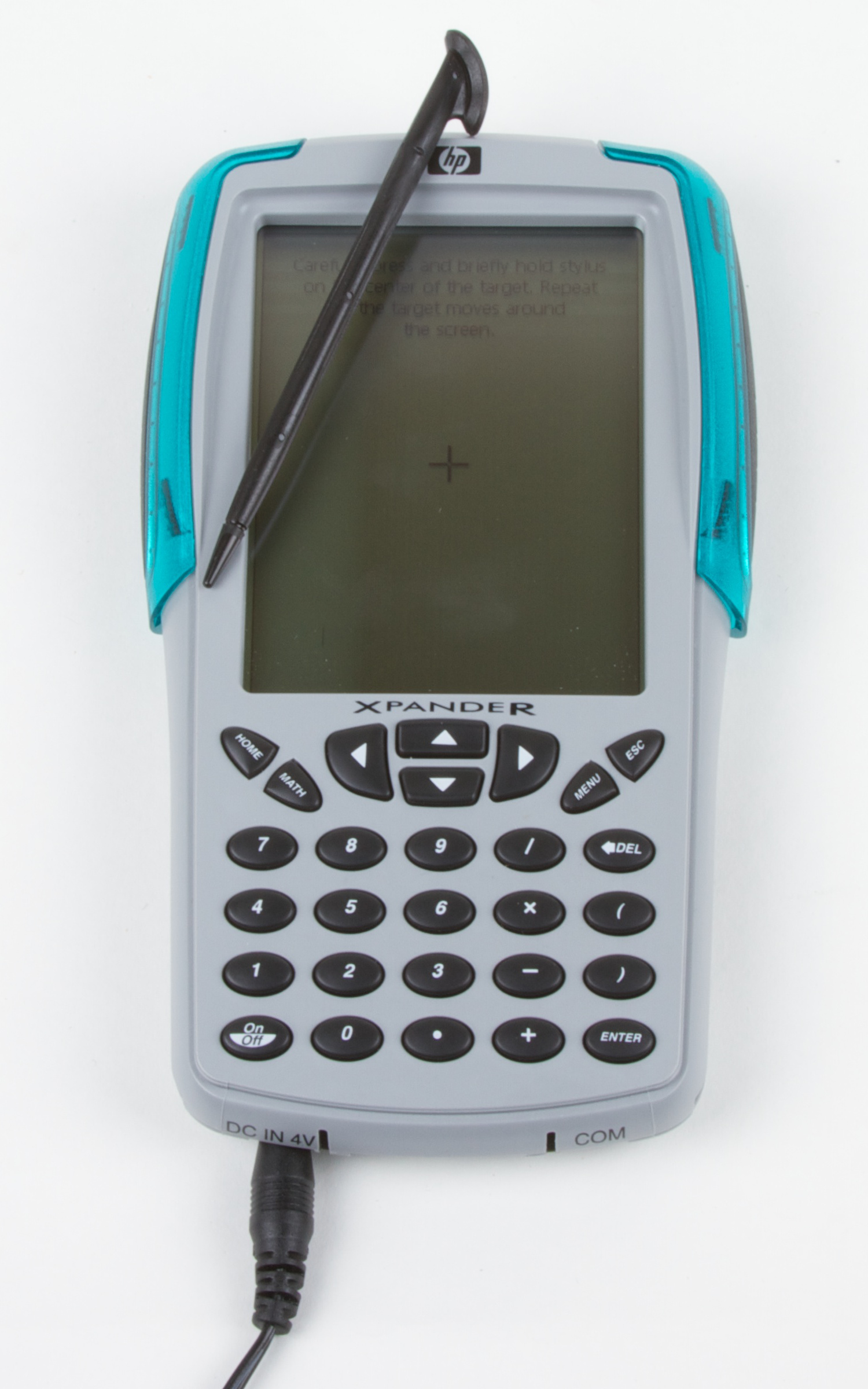
An HP Xpander

The HP Xpander (F1903A) aka "Endeavour" was to be Hewlett-Packard's newest graphing calculator in 2002, but the project was cancelled in November 2001 months before it was scheduled to go into production. It had both a keyboard and a pen-based interface, measured 162.6 mm by 88.9 mm by 22.9 mm, with a large grayscale screen, and ran on two rechargeable AA batteries. It had a semi-translucent green cover on a gray case and an expansion slot.

The underlying operating system was Windows CE 3.0. It had 8 MB RAM, 16 MB ROM, a geometry application, a 240×320 display, a Hitachi SH3 processor, and e-lessons. One of the obvious omissions in the Xpander was the lack of a computer algebra system (CAS).

== Math Xpander ==
After discontinuing the Xpander, HP decided to release the Xpander software, named the Math Xpander, as a free-of-charge application that ran on Windows CE-based Pocket PC devices. It was hosted by Saltire Software, who had been involved in its design.

== See also ==
- List of Hewlett-Packard products: Pocket calculators
- HP calculators
- Casio ClassPad 300 — a similar device by Casio
- TI PLT SHH1
- HP Jornada X25
