= Bigatti =

Bigatti is an Italian surname. Notable people with this name include:

- Alfredo Bigatti (1898–1964), Argentine sculptor
- Anna Maria Bigatti, Italian mathematician
- Enrico Bigatti (1910–1960), Italian priest, educator, and anti-fascist
