= Soft Warehouse =

Soft Warehouse may refer to:

- Soft Warehouse (Hawaii), a software company in the 1970s and 1980s, later acquired by Texas Instruments
- Soft Warehouse (Texas), a company in the 1980s that later became CompUSA
