= S1600 =

S1600 may refer to:

- PV-S1600, a Casio Pocket viewer model
- Super 1600, 2001 rally car formula
