= SMath Studio =

Algebra and graphing software

- SMath Studio v0.82 in Windows XP
- Developer: Andrey Ivashov
- Release: 2006, 19–20 years ago
- Stable release: 1.5.0.9678 / 1 July 2026; 3 months ago
- Written in: C#
- Operating system: Microsoft Windows, Linux, iOS, Android, Universal Windows Platform, and handhelds
- Platform: .NET Framework, Mono
- Size: 2.28 MB
- Available in: 43 languages
- List of languages Arabic, Belarusian, Bengali, Bulgarian, Catalan, Chinese (Simplified), Chinese (Traditional), Croatian, Czech, Danish, Dutch, English, Esperanto, Finnish, French, German, Greek, Hebrew, Hungarian, Indonesian, Italian, Japanese, Korean, Latvian, Lithuanian, Norwegian, Persian, Polish, Portuguese, Portuguese (Brazil), Romanian, Russian, Serbian (Cyrillic), Serbian (Latin), Slovak, Slovenian, Spanish, Swahili, Swedish, Thai, Turkish, Ukrainian, Vietnamese
- Type: Computer algebra system
- License: Creative Commons Attribution-NoDerivs (CC-BY-ND)
- Website: smath.com

SMath Studio is a freeware (free of charge for personal use, but not libre), closed-source, mathematical notebook program similar to Mathcad. It is available for Windows, Linux, iOS, Android, Universal Windows Platform, and on some handhelds.

Among its capabilities are:

- Solving differential equations;
- Graphing functions in two or three dimensions;
- Symbolic calculations, including solving systems of equations;
- Matrix operations, including determinants;
- Finding roots of polynomials and functions;
- Symbolic and numeric differentiation of functions;
- Numeric integration;
- Simple multiline looped programs;
- User-defined functions;
- Units of measurement.

SMath has been applied in the fields of physics and thermal engineering.
