= Horatio Scott Carslaw =

Scottish-Australian mathematician

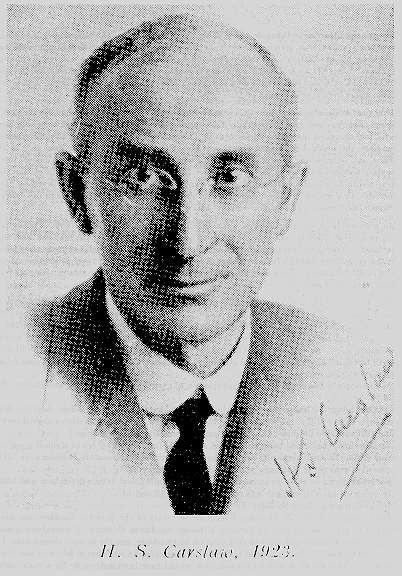
Horatio Scott Carslaw

Dr Horatio Scott Carslaw FRSE LLD (12 February 1870, Helensburgh, Dunbartonshire, Scotland – 11 November 1954, Burradoo, New South Wales, Australia) was a Scottish-Australian mathematician. The book he wrote with his colleague John Conrad Jaeger, Conduction of Heat in Solids, remains a classic in the field.

== Early life and education ==
Carslaw was born in Helensburgh, Scotland, the son of the Rev Dr William Henderson Carslaw (a Free Church minister) and his wife, Elizabeth Lockhead. He was educated at The Glasgow Academy. He went on to study at Cambridge University and then obtained a postgraduate doctorate at Glasgow University.

== Career ==
Carslaw was elected a Fellow of the Royal Society of Edinburgh in 1901. He was a Fellow of Emmanuel College, Cambridge and worked as a lecturer in Mathematics at Glasgow University when, in late 1902, he moved to Australia.

In 1903, upon the retirement of Theodore Thomas Gurney, Carslaw was appointed Professor and the Chair of Pure and Applied Mathematics in the now School of Mathematics and Statistics at the University of Sydney. He retired in 1935 to his house in Burradoo where he produced most of his best work. The Carslaw Building at the University, completed in the 1960s and containing the school, is named after him.

== Personal life and death ==
Carslaw married Ethel Maude Clarke (daughter of Sir William Clarke, 1st Baronet) in 1907 but she died later in the same year.

Carslaw died at home in Burradoo, New South Wales and was buried in the Anglican section of Bowral Cemetery in Bowral, New South Wales.

== Works ==
- An introduction to infinitesimal calculus, 1905
- Introduction to the theory of Fourier's series and integrals and the mathematical theory of the conduction of heat, London 1906, revised 2nd edn. 1921, published under the title Introduction to the mathematical theory of the conduction of heat in solids; revised and enlarged 3rd edn. 1930, published under the title Introduction to the theory of Fourier's series and integrals
- The Elements of Non-Euclidean Plane Geometry and Trigonometry, London 1916
- with John Conrad Jaeger: Operational methods in applied mathematics, 1941, 1948
- with Jaeger: Conduction of Heat in Solids, Oxford 1947, 1959

== See also ==
- Diffusion equation
- Heat equation
- Horosphere
- Thermal diffusivity
