= MATHLAB =

Computer algebra system

MATHLAB is a computer algebra system created in 1964 by Carl Engelman at MITRE and written in Lisp.

"MATHLAB 68" was introduced in 1967 and became rather popular in university environments running on DECs PDP-6 and PDP-10 under TOPS-10 or TENEX. In 1969 this version was included in the DECUS user group's library (as 10-142) as royalty-free software.

Carl Engelman left MITRE for Symbolics where he contributed his expert knowledge in the development of Macsyma.

== Features ==
Abstract from DECUS Library Catalog:

MATHLAB is an on-line system providing machine aid for the mechanical symbolic processes encountered in analysis. It is capable of performing, automatically and symbolically, such common procedures as simplification, substitution, differentiation, polynomial factorization, indefinite integration, direct and inverse Laplace transforms, the solution of linear differential equations with constant coefficients, the solution of simultaneous linear equations, and the inversion of matrices. It also supplies fairly elaborate bookkeeping facilities appropriate to its on-line operation.

== Applications ==
MATHLAB 68 has been used to solve electrical linear circuits using an acausal modeling approach for symbolic circuit analysis. This application was developed as a plug-in for MATHLAB 68 (open-source), building on MATHLAB's linear algebra facilities (Laplace transforms, inverse Laplace transforms and linear algebra manipulation).

== Print publications ==
- Engelman, Carl (1971). "The legacy of MATHLAB 68". Proceedings of the second ACM symposium on Symbolic and algebraic manipulation - SYMSAC '71. New York, NY: ACM. pp. 29–41. doi:10.1145/800204.806265. ISBN 9781450377867. S2CID 14328833.
