= John Conrad Jaeger =

Australian mathematical physicist

John Conrad Jaeger, FRS (30 July 1907 – 15 May 1979), was an Australian mathematical physicist.

== Biography ==
Jaeger was born in Sydney, Australia, to Carl Jaeger, a cigar manufacturer of German origin. In 1924, Jaeger entered Sydney University at the age of 16, studying engineering, mathematics, and physics, and earned a B.Sc. in 1928. He then spent two additional years at Cambridge University, completing Part II of the Mathematical Tripos and continuing with research in theoretical physics.

In 1936, Jaeger began teaching mathematics at the University of Tasmania. He later moved to the University of Sydney, where he was appointed to a chair in mathematics and collaborated with Professor Horatio Scott Carslaw on applying mathematics to heat conduction. Their co-authored textbook, Conduction of Heat in Solids, became a seminal work in the field.

After the World War II, Jaeger returned to Tasmania as a senior lecturer and authored several books, including new editions of Operational Methods in Applied Mathematics (with Carslaw in 1948) and Conduction of Heat in Solids (with Carslaw in 1959). He also published An Introduction to Applied Mathematics in 1951 and An Introduction to the Laplace Transformation in 1959.

In 1951, Jaeger was invited to chair the new Department of Geophysics at the Australian National University in Canberra. He moved there in 1952, delivering his inaugural lecture in 1953 and initiating several research projects in the following years. The department was later named the Department of Geophysics and Geochemistry. Jaeger retired from ANU in 1972.

Jaeger was married twice: first to Sylvia Rees, from whom he divorced in 1950, and later to Martha Elizabeth (Patty) Clarke. He had no children from either marriage. Jaeger died on 15 May 1979 in Canberra and was cremated.

In honor of his contributions to Australian Earth science, the Australian Academy of Science annually awards the Jaeger Medal.

== Honours and awards ==
- 1930 Mayhew Prize for Mathematics from the Faculty of Mathematics, University of Cambridge
- 1947 Thomas Ranken Lyle Medal for Physics and Mathematics from the Australian National Research Council
- 1947 Walter Burfitt Prize from the Royal Society of New South Wales
- 1954 Elected Fellow of the Australian Academy of Science
- 1970 Elected Fellow of the Royal Society
- 1971 Rankine Lecture to the British Geotechnical Association
