= Anna Maria Bigatti =

Italian mathematician

Anna Maria Bigatti is an Italian mathematician specializing in computational methods for commutative algebra. She is a ricercatore in the department of mathematics at the University of Genoa. She is one of the developers of CoCoA, a computer algebra system, and of its core library CoCoALib.

== Education and career ==
Bigatti earned a laurea in mathematics in 1989 from the University of Genoa, and completed her Ph.D. in 1995 at the University of Turin. Her dissertation, Aspetti Combinatorici e Computazionali dell’Algebra Commutativa, was supervised by Lorenzo Robbiano. After postdoctoral study with Robbiano in Genoa, she took her present position as ricercatore in 1997.

== Books ==
Bigatti is an author or co-author of three Italian textbooks, Elementi di matematica - Esercizi con soluzioni per scienze e farmacia (with Grazia Tamone, 2013), Matematica di base (with Lorenzo Robbiano, 2014), and Matematica di base - Esercizi svolti, testi d'esame, richiami di teoria (with Grazia Tamone, 2016). She is also a co-editor of several books in mathematical research including Monomial ideals, computations and applications (Lecture Notes in Mathematics, Springer, 2013) and Computations and Combinatorics in Commutative Algebra (Lecture Notes in Mathematics, Springer, 2017).
