= University of Sydney School of Mathematics and Statistics =

School of Mathematics and Statistics
- Type: Public
- Established: 1991; 35 years ago
- Affiliations: University of Sydney
- Location: Camperdown / Darlington, New South Wales, Australia; 33.888502°S 151.190541°E
- Website: sydney.edu.au/science/maths
- Location within Australia

The School of Mathematics and Statistics is a constituent body of the Faculty of Science at the University of Sydney, Australia. It was established in its present form in 1991.

As of 10 August 2026, the Head of School is Professor Dingxuan Zhou, and the Deputy Head of School is Professor Peter Kim.

The Magma computer algebra system is produced and distributed by the Computational Algebra Group within the School.

== History ==
Mathematics has been taught at the university since its establishment. The first Professor of Mathematics was Morris Pell, one of the university's three foundation professors. Pell gave the first lecture in mathematics on 13 October 1852, two days after the university's inauguration, to all 24 students at the time. At least two years of mathematics were still required of all the university's students at the time of Pell's retirement in 1877.

The School of Mathematics and Statistics was established on 1 January 1991 with the merging of the departments of Applied Mathematics, Pure Mathematics, and Mathematical Statistics.

The School is located in the Carslaw Building, which was completed in the early 1960s, and is named after mathematician Horatio Carslaw (1870-1954), who was once Professor of Mathematics at the university.
