= Inference Corporation =

Artificial intelligence software company

- Founded: 1979; 47 years ago
- Defunct: 2000; 26 years ago
- Fate: Acquired by eGain
- Headquarters: Los Angeles, California, U.S.
- Website: inference.com at the Wayback Machine (archived 1999-02-09)

Inference Corporation was an American software company that specialized in artificial intelligence systems.

== History ==
Los Angeles-based Inference was founded in 1979. In the 1990s they built a case-based computer program for Compaq Computer Corporation that would enable dealing with a situation where "a computer printer turns out a blurry and smeared page" without having to call a help desk. Although such software already existed, the breakthrough was that it was small enough to fit "on three floppy disks."

The company's Automated Reasoning Tool (ART), initially implemented on a mainframe, subsequently made available on PCs, has been extended to ART-IM, an Information Management package; the product line originated in 1988.

Ford and AOL are among the household-known corporations that use Inference software to enhance customer service. Inference was acquired by eGain Corporation in 2000. Prior to that, Inference acquired 1981-founded Computer Mathematics Corporation, marketer of SMP (computer algebra system); Inference made another acquisition the year before they themselves were acquired by eGain.

== Automated Reasoning Tool ==
The Automated Reasoning Tool (ART) is a system designed by Paul Haley, Chuck Williams, Brad Allen, and Mark Wright, to design rule-based knowledge representations with options for frame and procedural methods of knowledge base representation.

ART's syntax influenced NASA's derived CLIPS in the mid-80s. ART is a derivative of OPS5, with extensions, built for the Inference Corporation.
