= Carl Engelman =

American computer scientist

- Born: 21 October 1929; Baltimore
- Died: 26 November 1983; Cambridge
- Education: City College of New York, Massachusetts Institute of Technology (M.S.)
- Known for: MATHLAB, Macsyma
- Scientific career

Carl Engelman (October 21, 1929 – November 26, 1983) was an American computer scientist. Carl is best known as the creator of MATHLAB. He was employed by Mitre Corporation and Symbolics.

He was a visiting professor at the University of Turin through a grant provided by National Research Council (Italy).
