= Pyglet =

Pyglet is a library for the Python programming language that provides an object-oriented application programming interface for the creation of games and other multimedia applications. pyglet runs on Microsoft Windows, macOS, and Linux; it is released under the BSD Licence. pyglet was first created by Alex Holkner.

== Features ==
Pyglet is written entirely in Python. Images, video, and sound files in a range of formats can be done natively but can also be expanded with the libav and ffmpeg libraries. It requires no external dependencies.

Text display and formatting

- Rich text formatting (bold, italic, underline, color change, background color, indent, lists) (pyglet.text.formats)
- Built-in layouts to support editable text
- Carets (pyglet.text.caret.Caret)
- HTML support (pyglet.text.layout.IncrementalTextLayout)

Image and sprite work

- Fast image processing and rendering
- Built-in sprites (pyglet.sprite)
- Animated images (*.gif)

Graphics

- OpenGL shaders supported
- Simple built-in shapes (rectangles, circles, triangles) (pyglet.shapes)
- Batched rendering (pyglet.graphics.Batch)
- 3D model rendering

Events and file system

- Resource management (pyglet.resource)
- Clock for processing events and time (pyglet.clock.Clock)
- Window events (pyglet.window.Window)
- Event dispatching (pyglet.event.EventDispatcher)
- Context management

Sprites, text layouts, and text functions are implemented. Multi-level lists are supported and can be created using HTML. Different sections of the displayed document can have distinct styles. A built-in caret provides support for text editing, resembling many features of a UI text input caret.

== Example ==
from pyglet.window import Window
from pyglet.app import run

window = Window(caption="Hello world!", width=640, height=480)

run()

In this example, lines 1-2 import the pyglet module's necessary components. Line 4 creates a window, and line 6 calls pyglet to run its event loop. Optionally an update rate (in frames per second) can be specified in a rate parameter.

== See also ==
- Pygame, another Python game API, a layer over Simple DirectMedia Layer
- Kivy (framework), a Python OpenGL-based UI for multitouch interactions
- Cocos2d
- Panda3D
