= Pocket Viewer =

Model range of personal digital assistants

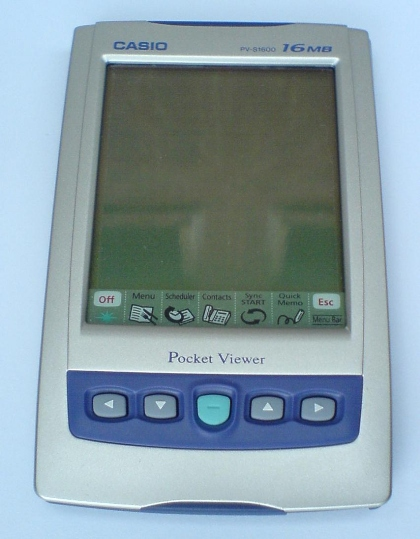
PV-S1600

Pocket Viewer (Casio PV) was a model range of personal digital assistants (PDAs) developed by Casio around the turn of the 21st century.

== Description ==
Pocket Viewer was a model range of PDAs from Casio. Early models used Intel x86 based processors (manufactured by NEC). Later models used Hitachi processors from the SuperH family. Both models ran Casio's proprietary OS 'CASIO PVOS'. The functionality of the pocket viewers extended beyond the digital diary segment and targeted consumers who needed more compute power in their personal organizers. The pocket viewers competed directly with the then market leader in the segment the Palm-pilots. They were priced under $200 at first release.

The pocket viewers, weighing under 5 ounces (141.7 grams), were light and portable. The face of the device was almost entirely covered by a monochrome liquid crystal display. Towards the bottom of the LCD there were a few navigation keys. The lower most part of the LCD had quick shortcuts to the standard applications permanently indicated. The short-cuts include off, back-light, Scheduler, Contacts, Quick Memo, Sync Start, Escape, Menubar. The standard applications available on the pocket viewer include Expense, PVsheet, Quickmemo, Contacts, Scheduler, ToDo list, Reminder/Calendar and Alarm. The starting interface consisted of a scrollable two column list of icons. Clicking on the icon starts the application. Text was entered via an on-screen keyboard. The pocket viewer did not have in-built hand writing recognition support. A third party GPL addin PVMerlin may have attempted to provide hand writing recognition.

Pocket viewers used conventional 2 x AAA batteries and under normal use a completely charged battery lasted around 2 months. When not actively being used the pocket viewer switches off the display and goes into power saving mode. The specifications stated that it could function for 50 hours on alkaline batteries without use of back-light. Except for PV-S1600 which used Universal Serial Bus (USB) 1.0, all the other pocket viewers used a COM (RS-232) port to communication between a personal computer and the pocket viewer.

Casio made the pocket viewer SDK available. Using the SDK users could create their own applications in C++ called add-ins, which could be downloaded to the pocket viewer using the synchronization software. In time, a small user base who created and made their add-in applications available on-line for free or for profit emerged. User forums such as pocketviewer.de, pocketviewer.com, pocket-viewer.ru and pocketviewer webrings flourished in their time and have since closed. During 2005–2010, the second hand market was on the wane. OWBasic, a third party add-in, by Wolfgang Ortmann, provided a dialect of the easy to learn and use BASIC programming language on the hand-helds, expanding their functionality from just PDAs to also being programmable hand-held calculators/computers. OWBASIC was implemented as a bytecode interpreter. The device had the computer power and functionality as the home computers of the 80s, such as Acorn Electron BASIC computer.

The pocket viewers ability to access the internet was limited. PC software could synchronize email with the device which was not convenient. The device had a specialized serial port, and could theoretically communicate with other devices using the Serial Line Internet Protocol and execute modem AT commands. Casio also provided some additional applications. Enterprise Harmony, which enabled Outlook 2003 synchronization of Outlook contacts, calendar On windows. PVsheet, a spread sheet application, which could upload/download comma separated spread-sheets. Travel phrase guide, which could translate preset text between English, Spanish, French, German, Italian, Japanese.

The Casio pocket viewer series was sandwiched between digital diaries and the pocket PC series Casio Cassiopeia. Casio discontinued the pocket viewers as the pocket PCs became popular and their price came down.

== Models ==
Generation	Model	Year	Data Storage	Interface	Processor	Display	Expandable	Market	Extra Features
1.	PV-100 PV-200	1999	1 MB 2 MB	RS-232	NEC V30MZ	128×128	-	Worldwide	
1.	PV-170 PV-270	1999	1 MB 2 MB	RS-232	NEC V30MZ	160×240	-	China	
2.	PV-250X PV-450X	2000	2 MB 4 MB	RS-232	NEC V30MZ	160×160	(by OS-Update)	Europe	
2.	PV-200A PV-400A	2000	2 MB 4 MB	RS-232	NEC V30MZ	160×160	-	USA	
2.	PV-750 / PV-750Plus	2000	2 MB	RS-232	NEC V30MZ	160×160	yes	Europe	IrDA-Interface
3.	PV-S250 PV-S450	2001	2 MB 4 MB	RS-232	NEC V30MZ	160×160	yes	Europe	
3.	PV-200e PV-400Plus	2001	2 MB 4 MB	RS-232	NEC V30MZ	160×160	-	USA	
4.	PV-S460 PV-S660	2002	4 MB 6 MB	RS-232	NEC V30MZ	160×160	yes	Europe	
4.	PV-S400Plus PV-S600Plus	2002	4 MB 6 MB	RS-232	NEC V30MZ	160×160	yes	USA	
5.	PV-S1600	2003	12 MB	USB 1.0	Hitachi SH-3	160×160	yes	Worldwide	

== Gallery ==
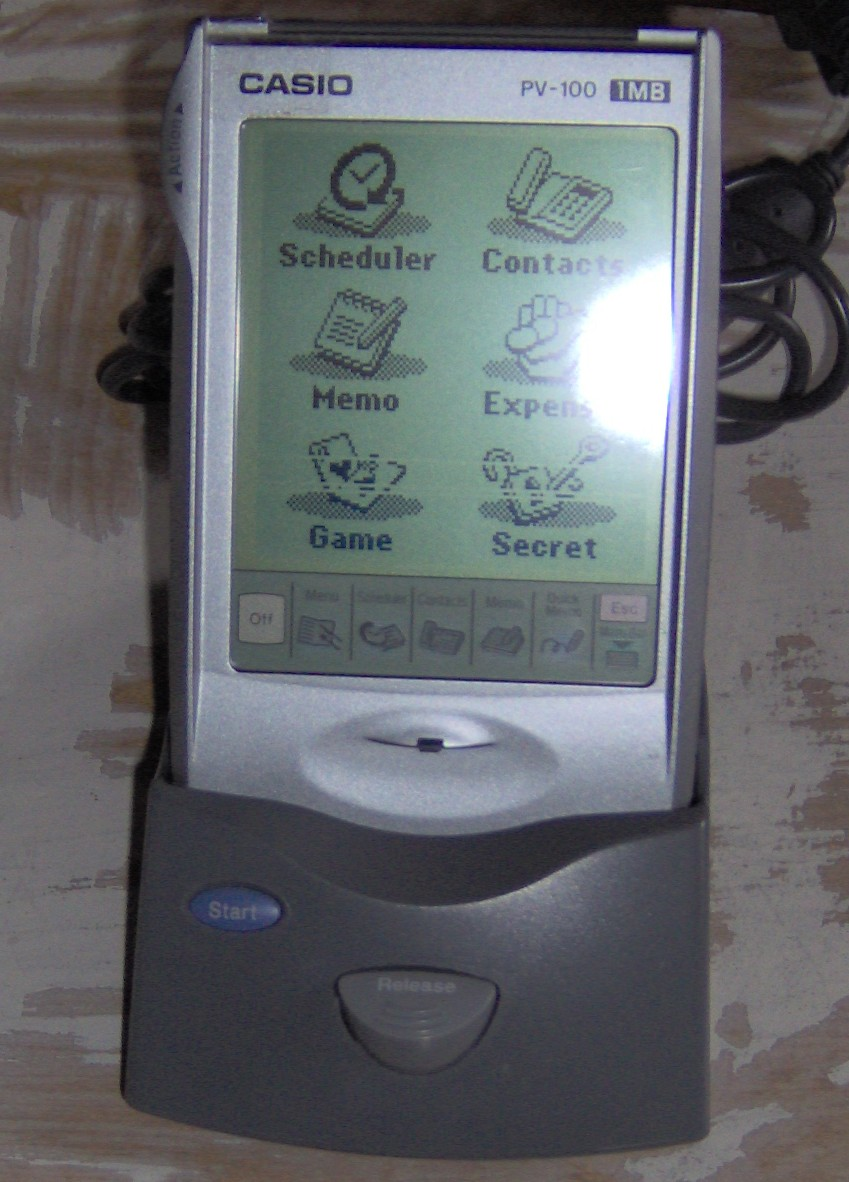
PV-100

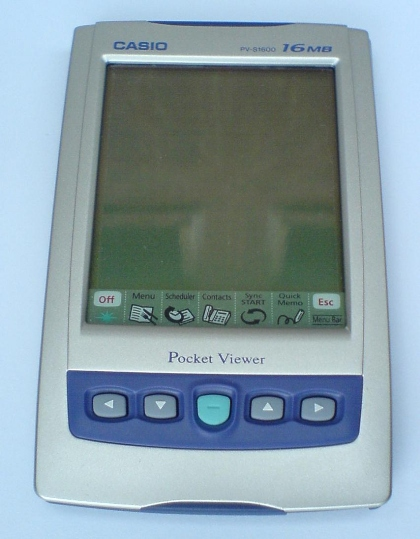
PV-S1600

== Technical details ==
- The PV-100 did not have a back light. While the back light was available on PV-200 onwards, Casio by default did not allow the back-light to remain on more than 30 seconds. Casio did not recommend extending the duration of the back light citing damage and battery drain. as A third party application back light extender add in was required to keep the back light on beyond the default duration. The back-light was Casio's trade marked EL-back-light, which is an electro-luminescent panel that causes the entire face to glow.
- The PV-S1600 did not use a NEC V30MZ processor, but used a Hitachi SH-3. The processor architectures are not compatible hence programs compiled for the earlier architectures do not work on the PV-S1600 without recompilation. OWBasic programs will work as they run in an interpreter.
- The NEC V30MZ was a 16 bit processor which used a segmented memory space. An indirect consequence is that those models can download a maximum of 16 addins
- The file system is divided into PVOS modes and sub modes. Each record is part of a file that is specified by mode and submode. Depending on the mode data sets are null-terminated in either binary or text format. Binary data sets are to 3 KB or 32 KB (records that are greater than 3 KB, can be loaded only into the far-segment, PV-S1600 has no restriction), text data sets to 2 KB (PV-S1600: limited 32 KB).
- The PV-750 has an IrDA port. Using IrDA, it is possible to send and receive email messages using a GSM-enabled mobile phone. SMS can also be sent on the PV-750Plus. The address book of the mobile phone can also be synchronized with that of PV. Casio's operating system update for the PV-750 gives it the same functionality of the PV-750Plus.

== Notes ==
- The HP 200LX a palm top computer, also used an 80186 chip
- The Casio ClassPad 300 is a maths orientated update of the pocket viewer.
- Casio did not provide any official linux support. Casio had contracted a 3rd party vendor for PC communication, and hence could not disclose any internal communication protocols. Apart from Casio PC sync and Enterprise Harmony, shareware Xlink/Win also provides communication with windows. An open-source GPL Linux application by the name PVlink is available with limited guarantees.
- Since Casio PVOS was a small proprietary OS, it did not benefit from mainstream platform support that Linux, or other proprietary OSes such as Pocket PC or Palm OS had.
