= Michael Stillman =

American mathematician

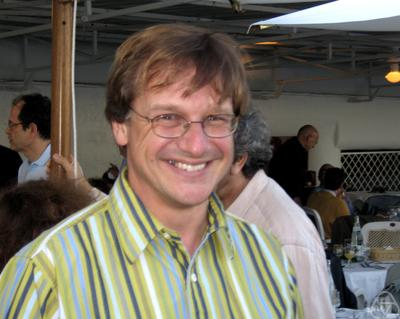
- Michael Stillman in 2006 at Oberwolfach
- Born: Michael Eugene Stillman; March 24, 1957 (age 69)
- Education: University of Illinois (BA); Harvard University (PhD)
- Known for: Macaulay2
- Scientific career
- Fields: Mathematics
- Workplaces: Cornell University
- Thesis: Construction of Holomorphic Differential Forms on the Moduli Space of Abelian Varieties (1983)
- Doctoral advisor: David Mumford
- Doctoral students: Hal Schenck
- Website: pi.math.cornell.edu/~mike/

Michael Eugene Stillman (born March 24, 1957) is an American mathematician working in computational algebraic geometry and commutative algebra. He is a professor of mathematics at Cornell University. He is known for being one of the creators (with Daniel Grayson) of the Macaulay2 computer algebra system.

== Education and career ==
Michael Stillman completed his PhD at Harvard University in 1983 under the direction of David Mumford. He had postdoctoral positions at the University of Chicago, Brandeis University, and the Massachusetts Institute of Technology before moving to a permanent position at Cornell University in 1987.

Stillman is best known for his work on computer algebra systems. In 1983, he began work with Dave Bayer on the Macaulay computer algebra system, which they continued to improve until 1993. To get beyond several limitations in the design of Macaulay, Stillman and Daniel Grayson began work on the Macaulay2 system in 1993. Macaulay2 remains in active development as of 2019, and has been cited in over 4350 articles.

Stillman has over 30 mathematical publications, and has advised 11 PhD students.

== Awards and honors ==
- In 2015 Stillman was selected as a fellow of the American Mathematical Society for his work in symbolic computation (such as that on Macaulay2).
- Stillman was recognized for his teaching by Business Insider in a 2013 feature on the Best Colleges in America, where he was named as one of the top 10 professors at Cornell.
