= CoCoA =

Computer algebra system

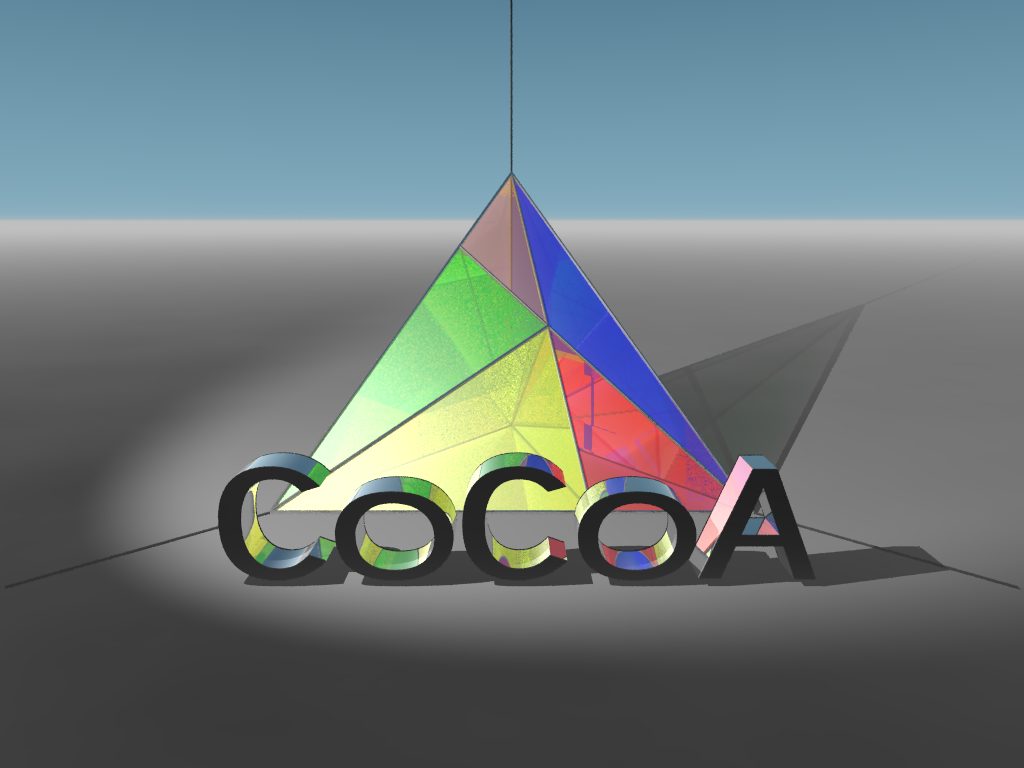
- Original authors: Abbott, J. and Bigatti, A. M. and Robbiano, L.
- Release: 1988; 38 years ago
- Stable release: 5.4.0 / 11 April 2022; 4 years ago
- Preview release: 5.4.1j / 21 February 2023; 3 years ago
- Written in: C++
- Operating system: Windows, Linux/Unix, macOS,
- Type: Computer algebra system
- License: GNU GPL
- Website: sites.google.com/view/cocoa-cocoalib

CoCoALib
- Original authors: Abbott, J. and Bigatti, A. M.
- Release: 9 March 2007; 19 years ago
- Stable release: 0.99800 / 28 April 2022; 4 years ago
- Preview release: 0.99718 / 14 February 2022; 4 years ago
- Written in: C++
- Type: Library
- License: GNU GPL
- Website: sites.google.com/view/cocoa-cocoalib

CoCoA (Computations in Commutative Algebra) is a free computer algebra system developed by the University of Genova, Italy, used to compute with numbers and polynomials. The CoCoA Library (CoCoALib) is available under GNU General Public License. CoCoA has been ported to many operating systems including Macintosh on PPC and x86, Linux on x86, Unix x86-64 & PPC, Solaris on SPARC and Windows on x86. CoCoA is mainly used by researchers (see citations at and), but can be useful even for "simple" computations.

CoCoA's features include:

- Very big integers and rational numbers using the GNU Multi-Precision Library
- Multivariate Polynomials
- Gröbner basis
- User interfaces: text; Emacs-based; Qt-based

It is able to perform simple and sophisticated operations on multivariate polynomials and on various data related to them (ideals, modules, matrices, rational functions). For example, it can readily compute Gröbner basis, syzygies and minimal free resolutions, intersection, division, the radical of an ideal, the ideal of zero-dimensional schemes, Poincaré series and Hilbert functions, factorization of polynomials, and toric ideals. The capabilities of CoCoA and the flexibility of its use are further enhanced by the dedicated high-level programming language.

Its mathematical core, CoCoALib, has been designed as an open source C++ library, focussing on ease of use and flexibility. It is available on GitHub: at https://github.com/cocoa-official/CoCoALib

CoCoALib is based on GNU Multi-Precision Library.

CoCoALib is used by ApCoCoA and NmzIntegrate

== See also ==
- List of computer algebra systems
- Standard Template Library
