= TI-92 series =

Series of graphing calculators

TI-92
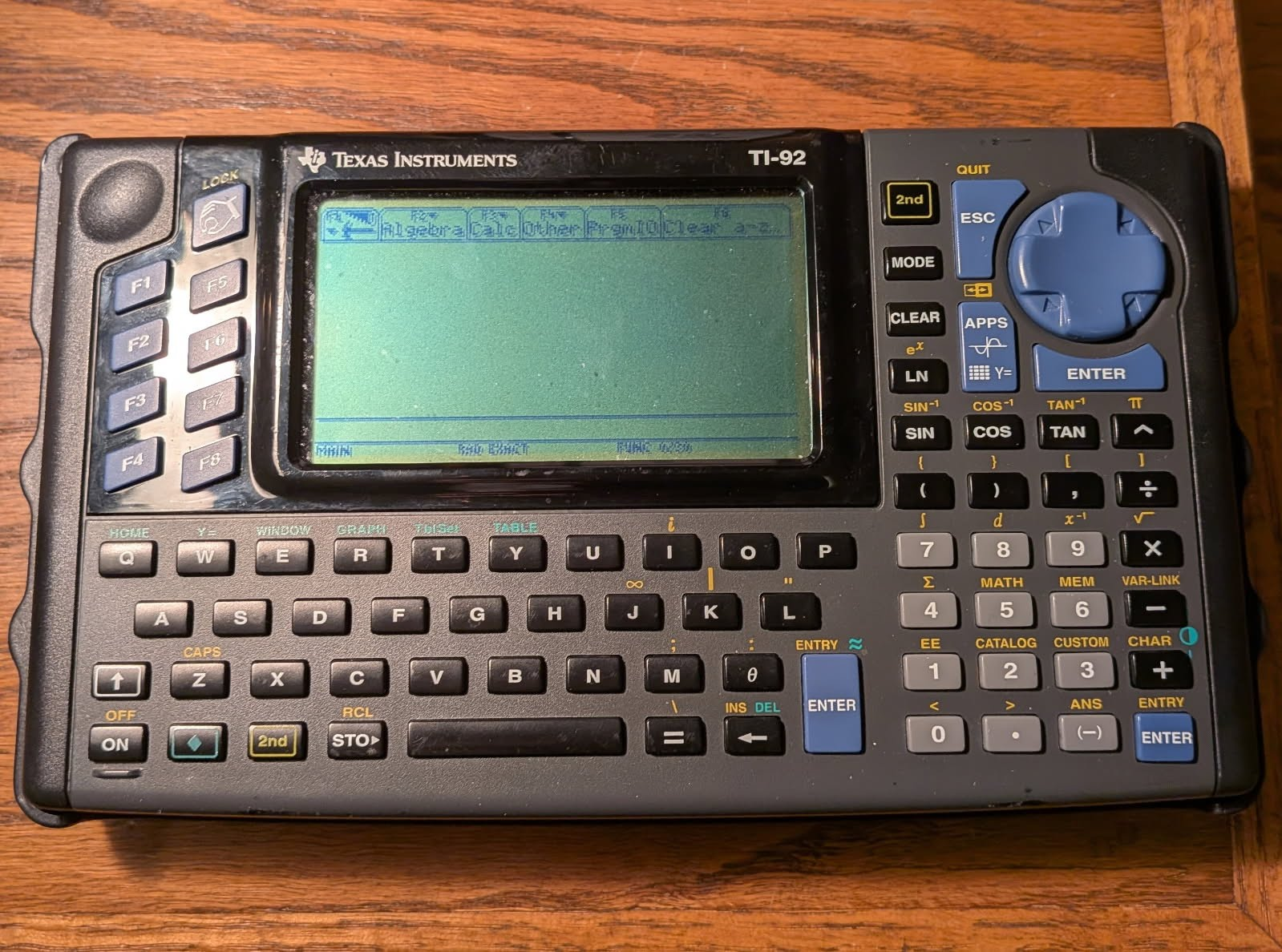
- The original TI–92
- Type: Programmable Graphing
- Introduced: 1995
- Discontinued: 1998
- Latest firmware: 1.12
- Successor: TI-92 Plus

Calculator
- Entry mode: D.A.L.
- Precision: 14
- Display type: LCD Dot-matrix
- Display size: 240x128

CPU
- Processor: Motorola MC68000
- Frequency: 10MHz

Programming
- Programming language(s): TI-BASIC
- Memory register: 68 kB RAM

Other
- Power supply: 4 AAs, 1 CR2032
- Weight: 493 grams (17.4 oz)
- Dimensions: 119 mm × 208 mm × 30 mm (4.7 in × 8.2 in × 1.20 in)

TI-92 II
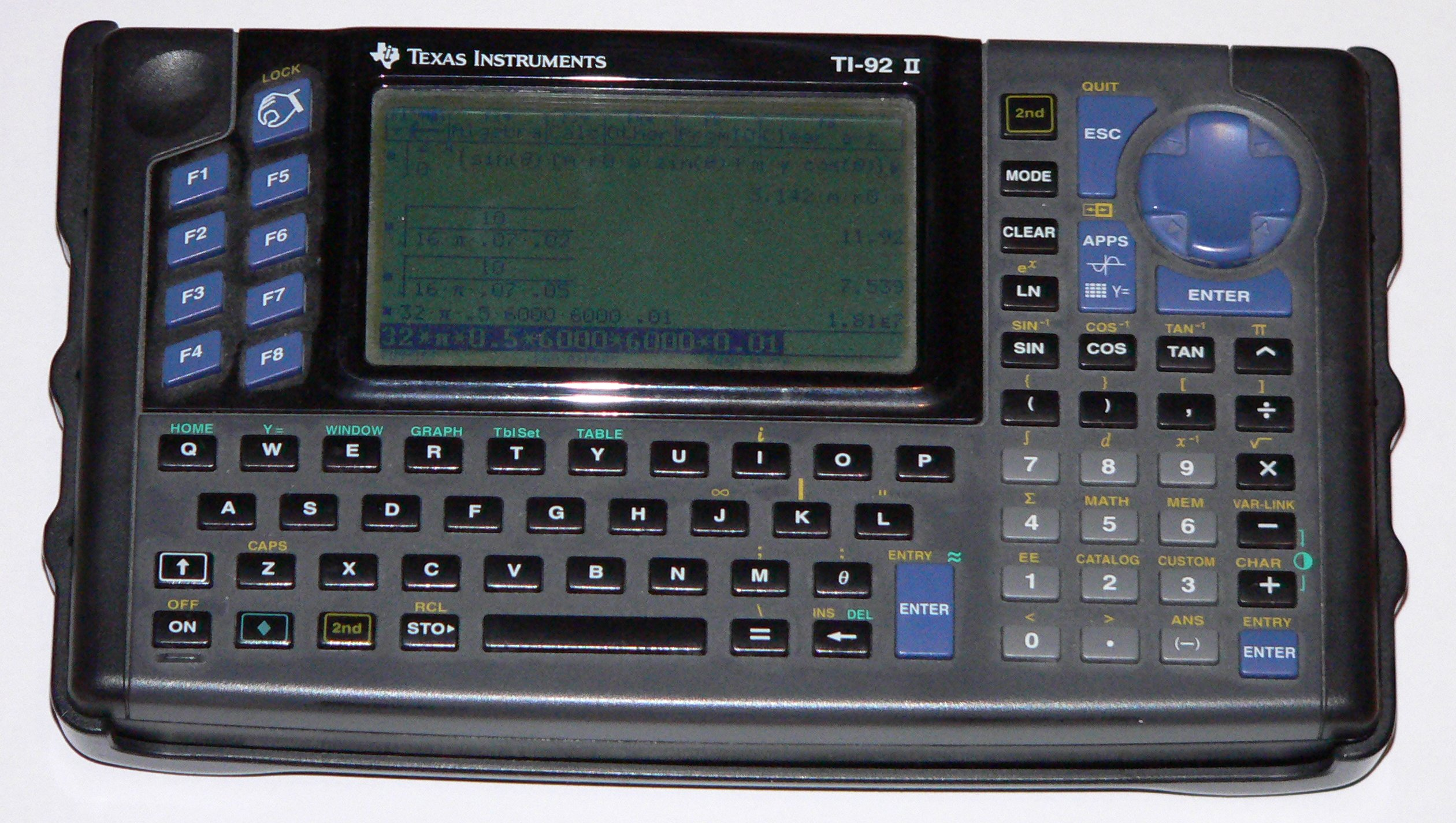
- TI-92 II
- Type: Programmable Graphing
- Introduced: 1996
- Discontinued: 1999
- Latest firmware: 2.1
- Successor: TI-92 Plus

Calculator
- Entry mode: D.A.L.
- Precision: 14
- Display type: LCD Dot-matrix
- Display size: 240x128

CPU
- Processor: Motorola MC68000
- Frequency: 10MHz

Programming
- Programming language(s): TI-BASIC
- Memory register: 128 kB RAM

Other
- Power supply: 4 AAs, 1 CR2032
- Weight: 493 grams (17.4 oz)
- Dimensions: 119 mm × 208 mm × 30 mm (4.7 in × 8.2 in × 1.20 in)

The TI-92 series are a line of graphing calculators produced by Texas Instruments. They include: the TI-92 (1995), the TI-92 II (1996), the TI-92 Plus (1998) and the Voyage 200 (2002). The design of these calculators includes a QWERTY keyboard. Because of this keyboard, they are given the status of a "computer" rather than a "calculator" by American testing facilities and cannot be used on tests such as the AP Exams while the TI-89 models can be used.

== TI-92 ==
The TI-92 was originally released in 1995, and was the first symbolic calculator made by Texas Instruments. It came with a computer algebra system (CAS) based on Derive, geometry based on Cabri II, and was one of the first calculators to offer 3D graphing. The TI-92 was not allowed on most standardized tests due mostly to its QWERTY keyboard. Its larger size was also rather cumbersome compared to other graphing calculators. In response to these concerns, Texas Instruments introduced the TI-89 which is functionally similar to the original TI-92, but featured Flash ROM and 188 KB RAM, and a smaller design without the QWERTY keyboard. The TI-92 was then replaced by the TI-92 Plus, which was essentially a TI-89 with the larger QWERTY keyboard design of the TI-92. Eventually, TI released the Voyage 200, which is a smaller, lighter version of the TI-92 Plus with more Flash ROM. The TI-92 is no longer sold through TI or its dealers, and is very hard to come by in stores.

== TI-92 II ==
The TI-92 II was released in 1996, and was the first successor to the TI-92. The TI-92 II was available both as a stand-alone product, and as a user-installable II module which could be added to original TI-92 units to gain most of the feature improvements. The TI-92 II module was introduced early in 1996 and added the choice of 5 user languages (English, French, German, Italian and Spanish) and almost doubled the User memory to 128k. Along with the TI-92, the TI-92 II was replaced by the TI-92 Plus in 1999, which offered even more Flash ROM and RAM.

== TI-92 Plus ==
TI-92 Plus
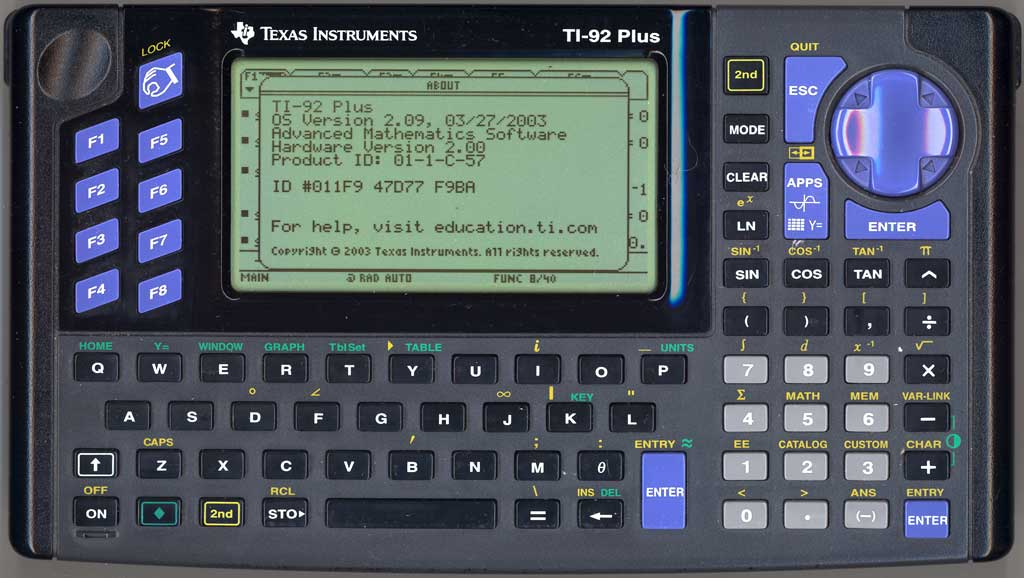
- TI-92 Plus
- Type: Programmable Graphing
- Introduced: 1998
- Discontinued: 2006
- Latest firmware: 2.09
- Predecessor: TI-92/TI-92 II
- Successor: Voyage 200

Calculator
- Entry mode: D.A.L.
- Precision: 14
- Display type: LCD Dot-matrix
- Display size: 240x128

CPU
- Processor: Motorola MC68000
- Frequency: 12MHz

Programming
- Programming language(s): TI-BASIC
- Memory register: 188 kB RAM; 702 kB flash memory

Other
- Power supply: 4 AAs, 1 CR2032
- Weight: 493 grams (17.4 oz)
- Dimensions: 119 mm × 208 mm × 30 mm (4.7 in × 8.2 in × 1.20 in)

The TI-92 Plus (or TI-92+) was released in 1998, slightly after the creation of the almost-identical (in terms of software) TI-89, while physically looking exactly like its predecessor, the TI-92 (which lacked flash memory). Besides increased memory over its predecessor, the TI-92 Plus also featured a sharper "black" screen, which had first appeared on the TI-89 and which eases viewing.

The TI-92 Plus was available both as a stand-alone product, and as a user-installable Plus module which could be added to original TI-92 and TI-92 II units to gain most of the feature improvements, most notably Flash Memory. A stand-alone TI-92 Plus calculator was functionally similar to the HW2 TI-89, while a module-upgraded TI-92 was functionally similar to the HW1 TI-89. Both versions could run the same releases of operating system software.

As of 2002, the TI-92 Plus was succeeded by the Voyage 200 and is no longer sold through TI or its dealers.

The TI-92 Plus is now available in an online emulator, featuring a list of frequently used commands.

== Voyage 200 ==
Voyage 200
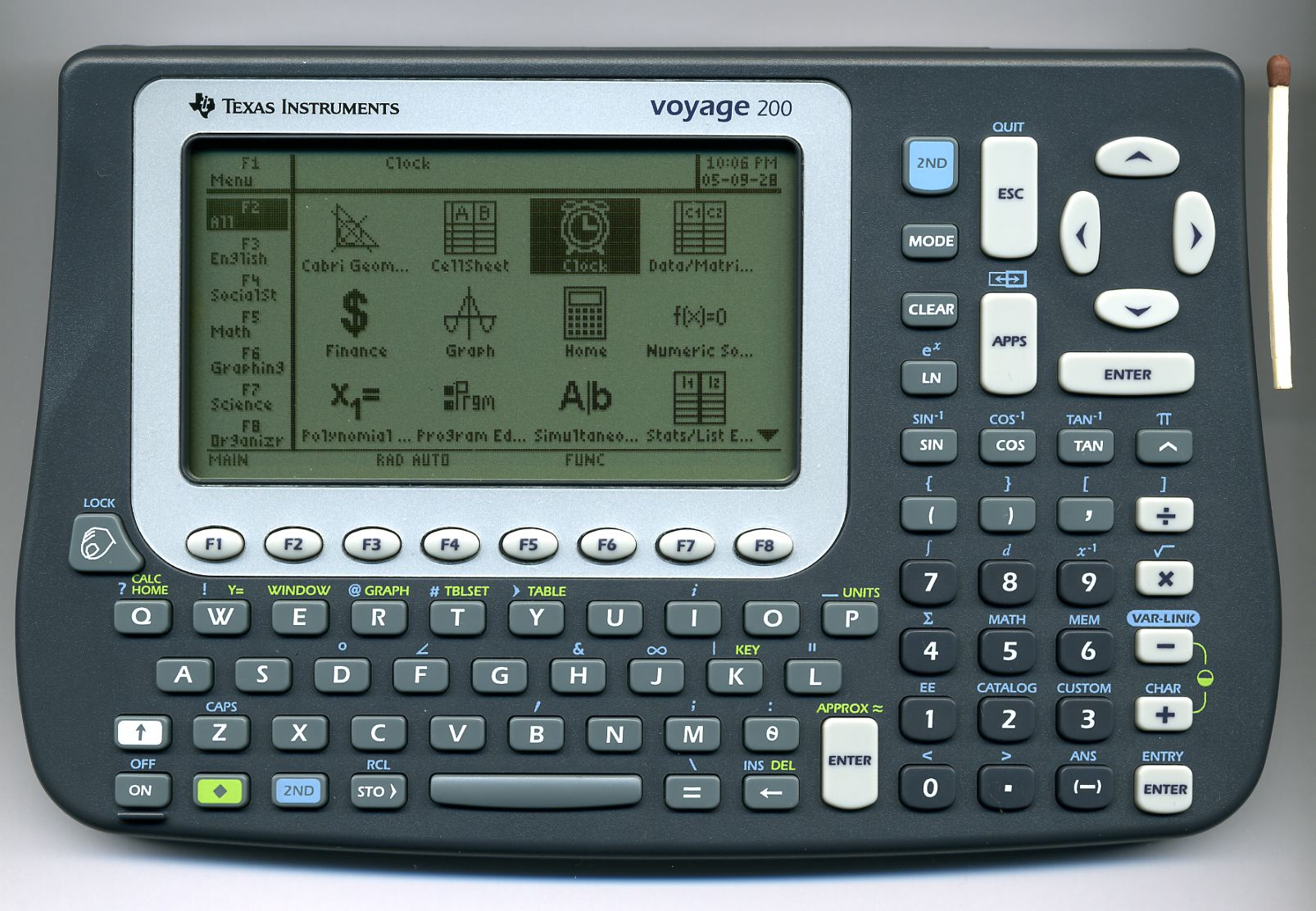
- Type: Programmable Graphing
- Introduced: 2002
- Discontinued: 2014
- Latest firmware: 3.10
- Predecessor: TI-92 Plus

Calculator
- Entry mode: D.A.L.
- Precision: 14
- Display type: LCD Dot-matrix
- Display size: 240x128

CPU
- Processor: Motorola MC68000
- Frequency: 12MHz

Programming
- Programming language(s): TI-BASIC
- Memory register: 188 kB RAM; 2.7 MB flash memory

Other
- Power supply: 4 AAAs, 1 CR1616 or CR1620
- Weight: 272 grams (9.6 oz)
- Dimensions: 117 mm × 185 mm × 28 mm (4.6 in × 7.3 in × 1.10 in)

Voyage 200 (also V200 and Voyage 200 PLT) was released in 2002, being the replacement for the TI-92 Plus, with its only hardware upgrade over that calculator being an increase in the amount of flash memory available (2.7 megabytes for the Voyage 200 vs. 702 kilobytes for the TI-92 Plus). It also features a somewhat smaller and more rounded case design.

Like its predecessor, Voyage 200 is an advanced calculator that supports plotting multiple functions on the same graph, parametric, polar, 3D, and differential equation graphing as well as sequence representations. Its symbolic calculation system is based on a trimmed version of the calculation software Derive. In addition to its algebra and calculus capabilities, the Voyage 200 is packaged with list, spreadsheet, and data processing applications and can perform curve fitting to a number of standard functions and other statistical analysis operations. The calculator can also run most programs written for the TI-89 and TI-92 as well as programs specifically written for it. A large number of applications, ranging from games to interactive periodic tables can be found online.

The V200 is easily mistaken for a PDA or a small computer because of its large enclosure and its full QWERTY keyboard — a feature which disqualifies the calculator for use in many tests and examinations, including the American ACT and SAT. The TI-89 Titanium offers exactly the same functionality in a smaller format. All calculators with computer algebra systems are illegal on both the SAT test and the ACT test.

== Features ==
=== Technical specifications ===
	TI-92	TI-92II	TI-92 Plus	Voyage 200
Display	240×128 pixels			
CPU	Motorola MC68000; 10 MHz		Motorola MC68000; 12 MHz	
RAM	128 KB (70 KB user-available)	256 KB (136 KB user-available)	256 KB (188 KB user-available)	
Flash ROM	1 MB ROM, (non-upgradable)		2 MB, (702 KB (Note: Official page specifies user-available ROM amount for TI-92 Plus as 702K, but other sources specify it as 388K. This is due to the TI-92 Plus coming with Cabri Geometry pre-installed, which uses the 314 KB difference.) user-available)	4 MB, (2.7 MB user-available)
Link capability	2.5 mm I/O port			
Power	4×AA, 1×CR2032			4×AAA, 1×CR1616
Release	1995	1996	1998, 1999	2002

== See also ==
- Comparison of Texas Instruments graphing calculators
