= Derive (computer algebra system) =

Computer algebra system

- Developers: Soft Warehouse, Texas Instruments
- Final release: 6.10 / October 2004
- Written in: muLISP
- Operating system: Windows, MS-DOS
- Type: Computer algebra system
- License: Proprietary
- Website: www.chartwellyorke.com/derive.html

Derive was a computer algebra system, developed as a successor to muMATH by the Soft Warehouse in Honolulu, Hawaii, now owned by Texas Instruments. Derive was implemented in muLISP, also by Soft Warehouse. The first release was in 1988 for MS-DOS. It was discontinued on June 29, 2007, in favor of the TI-Nspire CAS. The final version is Derive 6.1 for Windows.

Since Derive required comparably little memory, it was suitable for use on older and smaller machines. It was available for the DOS and Windows platforms and served as an inspiration for the computer algebra system in certain TI pocket calculators.

== Books ==
- Derive 1.0 - A Mathematical Assistant Program (2nd printing, 3rd ed.). Honolulu, Hawaii, USA: Soft Warehouse, Inc. August 1989 [June 1989 (September 1988)].
- Jerry Glynn, Exploring Math from Algebra to Calculus with Derive, A Mathematical Assistant, Mathware Inc, 1992, ISBN 0-9623629-0-5
- Leon Magiera, General Physics Problem Solving With Cas Derive, Nova Science Pub Inc 2001, ISBN 1-59033-057-9
- Vladimir Dyakonov. Handbook on application system Derive. Moscow (Russia) 1996, Phismatlit, 320 p, ISBN 5-02-015100-9
- Vladimir Dyakonov. Computers algebra systems Derive. Moscow (Russia) 2002, SOLON-R, 320 p, ISBN 5-93455-139-6

== See also ==
- List of computer algebra systems
