= MuMATH =

Computer Algebra Program

muMATH is a computer algebra system developed in the late 1970s and early 1980s by Albert D. Rich and David Stoutemyer of Soft Warehouse in Honolulu, Hawaii. It is implemented in the muSIMP programming language which is built on top of a LISP dialect called muLISP. It supports CP/M and TRS-DOS (since muMATH-79), Apple II (since muMATH-80) and MS-DOS (in muMATH-83, the final version, which was published by Microsoft).

The Soft Warehouse later developed Derive, another computer algebra system. The company was purchased by Texas Instruments in 1999, and development of Derive ended in 2006.

== Literature ==
- David D. Shochat, A Symbolic Mathematics System, Creative Computing, Oct. 1982, p. 26
- Gregg Williams, The muSIMP/muMATH-79 Symbolic Math system, a Review, BYTE, Nov. 1980, p. 324
- Stuart Edwards, A Computer-Algebra-Based Calculating System, BYTE 12/1983, pp- 481-494 (Describes a calculator application of muSIMP / muMATH doing automatic unit conversion.)
