= Computer algebra system =

Mathematical software

A computer algebra system (CAS) or symbolic algebra system (SAS) is any mathematical software with the ability to manipulate mathematical expressions in a way similar to the traditional manual computations of mathematicians and scientists. The development of the computer algebra systems in the second half of the 20th century is part of the discipline of "computer algebra" or "symbolic computation", which has spurred work in algorithms over mathematical objects such as polynomials.

Computer algebra systems may be divided into two classes: specialized and general-purpose. The specialized ones are devoted to a specific part of mathematics, such as number theory, group theory, or teaching of elementary mathematics.

General-purpose computer algebra systems aim to be useful to a user working in any scientific field that requires manipulation of mathematical expressions. To be useful, a general-purpose computer algebra system must include various features such as:

- a user interface allowing a user to enter and display mathematical formulas, typically from a keyboard, menu selections, mouse or stylus.
- a programming language and an interpreter (the result of a computation commonly has an unpredictable form and an unpredictable size; therefore user intervention is frequently needed),
- a simplifier, which is a rewrite system for simplifying mathematics formulas,
- a memory manager, including a garbage collector, needed by the huge size of the intermediate data, which may appear during a computation,
- an arbitrary-precision arithmetic implementation, needed by the huge size of the integers that may occur,
- a large library of mathematical algorithms and special functions.

The library must not only provide for the needs of the users, but also the needs of the simplifier. For example, the computation of polynomial greatest common divisors is systematically used for the simplification of expressions involving fractions.

This large amount of required computer capabilities explains the small number of general-purpose computer algebra systems. Significant systems include Axiom, GAP, Maxima, Magma, Maple, Mathematica, SageMath, and SymPy.

== History ==
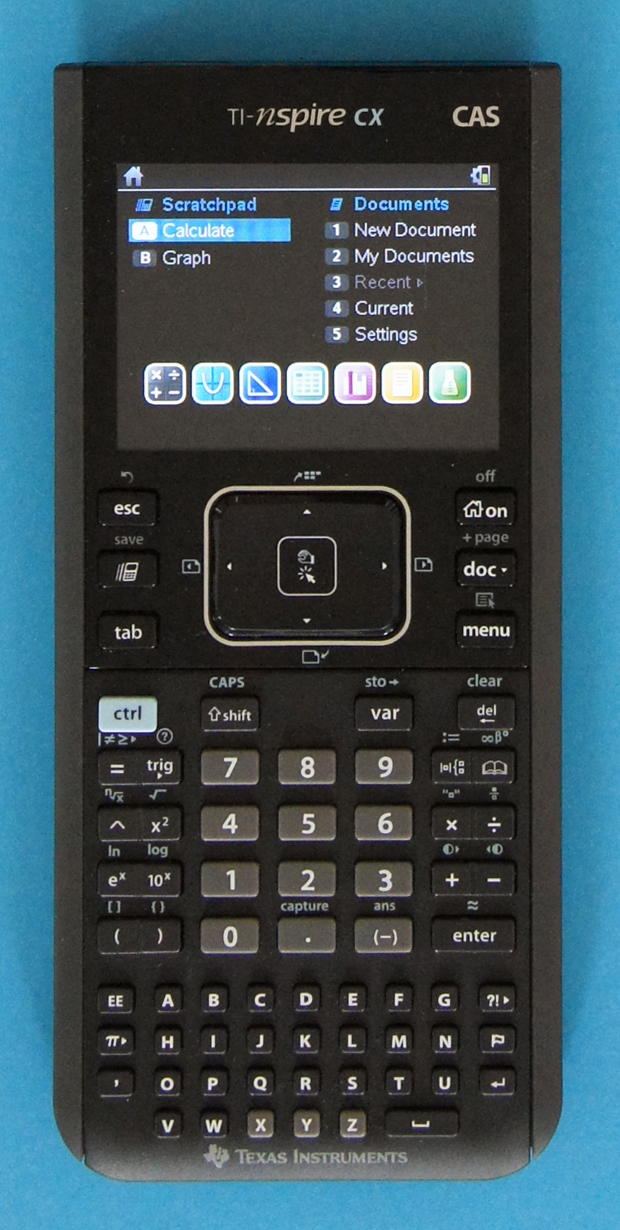
A Texas Instruments TI-Nspire calculator that contains a computer algebra system

In the 1950s, while computers were mainly used for numerical computations, there were some research projects into using them for symbolic manipulation. Computer algebra systems began to appear in the 1960s and evolved out of two quite different sources—the requirements of theoretical physicists and research into artificial intelligence.

A prime example of the first development was the pioneering work conducted by the later Nobel Prize laureate in physics Martinus Veltman, who designed a program for symbolic mathematics, especially high-energy physics, called Schoonschip (Dutch for "clean ship") in 1963. Other early systems include FORMAC.

Using Lisp as the programming basis, Carl Engelman created MATHLAB in 1964 at MITRE within an artificial-intelligence research environment. MATHLAB was later made available to users on PDP-6 and PDP-10 systems running TOPS-10 or TENEX in universities. Today it can still be used on SIMH emulations of the PDP-10. MATHLAB (Mathematical Laboratory) should not be confused with MATLAB (Matrix Laboratory), which is a system for numerical computation built 15 years later at the University of New Mexico.

There were in the mid-sixties several groups working on symbolic systems and algorithms. Jean Sammet of IBM brought them together in a conference, called SYMSAM, that she organized in 1966 ; Sammet also founded SICSAM, the Special Interest Committee on Symbolic and Algebraic Manipulation. SICSAM later became SIGSAM.

Building on the success of MATHLAB and other early CAS, back at MIT, W. A. Martin began deliberations regarding a new symbolic mathematics system, Macsyma, that would combine all the work of himself, of Carl Engelman and of Joel Moses, and would use the latest algorithms that they heard about at the 1966 SYMSAM. Macsyma was made public at the 1971 SIGSAM Symposium.

In 1987, Hewlett-Packard introduced the first hand-held calculator CAS with the HP-28 series. Other early handheld calculators with symbolic algebra capabilities included the Texas Instruments TI-89 series and TI-92 calculator, and the Casio CFX-9970G.

The follow-on popular computer algebra systems include muMATH, Reduce, Derive (based on muMATH), and Macsyma; a copyleft version of Macsyma is called Maxima. Reduce became free software in 2008. Commercial systems include Mathematica and Maple, which are commonly used by research mathematicians, scientists, and engineers. Freely available alternatives include SageMath (which can act as a front-end to several other free and nonfree CAS). Other significant systems include Axiom, GAP, Maxima and Magma.

The movement to web-based applications in the early 2000s saw the release of WolframAlpha, an online search engine and CAS which includes the capabilities of Mathematica.

More recently, computer algebra systems have been implemented using artificial neural networks.

== Symbolic manipulations ==
At its inception around 1968, Macsyma (an acronym for Project MAC's Symbolic Manipulator), was written in LISP and designed to utilize multiple data representations. Its general expression representation was modeled after FORMAC, though adapted to use LISP list structures. While this allowed the software to represent any arbitrary mathematical expression, its built-in simplifier had limited capabilities.

To address specific mathematical operations, Macsyma included a rational function representation—similar to ALPAK—which processed ratios of multivariable polynomials with integer coefficients. This representation relied on a greatest common divisor (GCD) algorithm to automatically maintain these functions in simplified forms. As the software evolved, its developers expanded its architecture to include additional representations, notably for power series.

A Computer Algebra System typically includes symbolic manipulations such as:

- simplification to a smaller expression or some standard form, including automatic simplification with assumptions and simplification with constraints
- substitution of symbols or numeric values for certain expressions
- change of form of expressions: expanding products and powers, partial and full factorization, rewriting as partial fractions, constraint satisfaction, rewriting trigonometric functions as exponentials, transforming logic expressions, etc.
- partial and total differentiation
- some indefinite and definite integration (see symbolic integration), including multidimensional integrals
- symbolic constrained and unconstrained global optimization
- solution of linear and some non-linear equations over various domains
- solution of some differential and difference equations
- taking some limits
- integral transforms
- series operations such as expansion, summation and products
- matrix operations including products, inverses, etc.
- statistical computation
- theorem proving and verification which is very useful in the area of experimental mathematics
- optimized code generation

In the above, the word some indicates that the operation cannot always be performed.

== Additional capabilities ==
Many also include:

- a programming language, allowing users to implement their own algorithms
- arbitrary-precision numeric operations
- exact integer arithmetic and number theory functionality
- Editing of mathematical expressions in two-dimensional form
- plotting graphs and parametric plots of functions in two and three dimensions, and animating them
- drawing charts and diagrams
- APIs for linking it on an external program such as a database, or using in a programming language to use the computer algebra system
- string manipulation such as matching and searching
- add-ons for use in applied mathematics such as physics, bioinformatics, computational chemistry and packages for physical computation
- solvers for differential equations
- pretty-printing output to conform to standard mathematical notation conventions

Some include:

- graphic production and editing such as computer-generated imagery and signal processing as image processing
- sound synthesis

Some computer algebra systems focus on specialized disciplines; these are typically developed in academia and are free. They can be inefficient for numeric operations as compared to numeric systems.

== Types of expressions ==
The expressions manipulated by a CAS typically include multivariable polynomials; standard functions of expressions (sine, exponential, etc.); various special functions (Γ, ζ, erf, Bessel functions, etc.); arbitrary functions of expressions; optimization; derivatives, integrals, simplifications, sums, and products of expressions; truncated series with expressions as coefficients, matrices of expressions, and so on. Numeric domains supported typically include floating-point representation of real numbers, integers (of unbounded size), complex (floating-point representation), interval representation of reals, rational number (exact representation) and algebraic numbers.

== Use in education ==
There have been many advocates for increasing the use of computer algebra systems in primary and secondary-school classrooms. The primary reason for such advocacy is that computer algebra systems represent real-world math more than do paper-and-pencil or hand calculator based mathematics. This push for increasing computer usage in mathematics classrooms has been supported by some boards of education. It has even been mandated in the curriculum of some regions.

Computer algebra systems have been extensively used in higher education. Many universities offer either specific courses on developing their use, or they implicitly expect students to use them for their course work. The companies that develop computer algebra systems have pushed to increase their prevalence among university and college programs.

CAS-equipped calculators are not permitted on the ACT, the PLAN, the SAT, and in some classrooms though it may be permitted on College Board's calculator-permitted AP tests, including the AP Calculus, Chemistry, Physics, and Statistics exams.

== Mathematics used in computer algebra systems ==
- Knuth–Bendix completion algorithm
- Root-finding algorithms
- Symbolic integration via e.g. Risch algorithm or Risch–Norman algorithm
- Hypergeometric summation via e.g. Gosper's algorithm
- Limit computation via e.g. Gruntz's algorithm
- Polynomial factorization via e.g., over finite fields, Berlekamp's algorithm or Cantor–Zassenhaus algorithm.
- Greatest common divisor via e.g. Euclidean algorithm
- Gaussian elimination
- Gröbner basis via e.g. Buchberger's algorithm; generalization of Euclidean algorithm and Gaussian elimination
- Padé approximant
- Schwartz–Zippel lemma and testing polynomial identities
- Chinese remainder theorem
- Diophantine equations
- Landau's algorithm (nested radicals)
- Derivatives of elementary functions and special functions. (e.g. See derivatives of the incomplete gamma function.)
- Cylindrical algebraic decomposition
- Quantifier elimination over real numbers via cylindrical algebraic decomposition

== See also ==
- List of computer algebra systems
- Scientific computation
- Statistical package
- Automated theorem proving
- Algebraic modeling language
- Constraint-logic programming
- Satisfiability modulo theories
