= Resultant =

Mathematical concept in polynomial theory

In mathematics, the resultant of two polynomials is a polynomial expression of their coefficients that is equal to zero if and only if the polynomials have a common root (possibly in a field extension), or, equivalently, a common factor (possibly in a field extension as well). In some older texts, the resultant is also called the eliminant.

The resultant is widely used in number theory, either directly or through the discriminant, which is essentially the resultant of a polynomial and its derivative. The resultant of two polynomials with rational or polynomial coefficients may be computed efficiently on a computer. It is a basic tool of computer algebra, and is a built-in function of most computer algebra systems. It is used, among others, for cylindrical algebraic decomposition, integration of rational functions and drawing of curves defined by a bivariate polynomial equation.

The resultant of n homogeneous polynomials in n variables (also called multivariate resultant, or Macaulay's resultant) is a generalization of the usual n = 2 case, due to Macaulay. It is, along with Gröbner bases, one of the main tools of elimination theory.

== Notation ==
The resultant of two univariate polynomials A and B is commonly denoted $\operatorname{res}(A,B)$ or $\operatorname{Res}(A,B).$

In many applications of the resultant, the polynomials depend on several indeterminates and may be considered as univariate polynomials in one of their indeterminates, with polynomials in the other indeterminates as coefficients. In this case, the indeterminate that is selected for defining and computing the resultant is indicated as a subscript: $\operatorname{res}_x(A,B)$ or $\operatorname{Res}_x(A,B).$

The degrees of the polynomials are used in the definition of the resultant. However, a polynomial of degree d may also be considered as a polynomial of higher degree where the leading coefficients are zero. If such a higher degree is used for the resultant, it is usually indicated as a subscript or a superscript, such as $\operatorname{res}_{d,e}(A,B)$ or $\operatorname{res}_x^{d,e}(A,B).$

== Definition ==
The resultant $\mathop{\rm res}(A,B)$ of two univariate polynomials $A,B$ with coefficients in a field (or a commutative ring) is the determinant of their Sylvester matrix. More precisely, let
$$A = a_0 x^d + a_1 x^{d-1} + \cdots + a_d$$
and
$$B = b_0 x^e + b_1 x^{e-1} + \cdots + b_e$$
be nonzero polynomials of degrees $d$ and $e$ respectively. Let $\mathcal{P}_n$ denote the $n$-dimensional vector space (or free module) of polynomials with degree at most $n{-}1$. The map
$$\varphi:\mathcal{P}_{e}\times \mathcal{P}_{d}
\rightarrow \mathcal{P}_{d+e},
\qquad
\varphi(P,Q) = AP + BQ,$$
is a linear map between two spaces of dimension $d+e$. With respect to the descending monomial bases
$$\{(x^{e-1},0),(x^{e-2},0),\ldots,(1,0),
(0,x^{d-1}),(0,x^{d-2}),\ldots,(0,1)\}
\subset \mathcal{P}_e\times \mathcal{P}_d$$
and
$$\{x^{d+e-1},x^{d+e-2},\ldots, 1\}
\subset \mathcal{P}_{d+e},$$
the matrix of $\varphi$ is the Sylvester matrix:
$$\begin{pmatrix}
a_0      & 0           & \cdots & 0          & b_0        & 0              & \cdots & 0       \\
a_1    & a_0       & \cdots & 0           & b_1     & b_0           & \cdots & 0  \\
a_2    & a_1     & \ddots & 0           & b_2     & b_1         & \ddots & 0 \\
\vdots  &\vdots   & \ddots & a_0        & \vdots   &\vdots       & \ddots & b_0  \\
a_d       & a_{d-1} & \cdots & \vdots   & b_e       & b_{e-1}     & \cdots & \vdots\\
0          & a_d       & \ddots &  \vdots  & 0          & b_e          & \ddots &  \vdots  \\
\vdots  & \vdots   & \ddots & a_{d-1}  & \vdots  & \vdots      & \ddots & b_{e-1}   \\
0          & 0          & \cdots  & a_d       & 0           & 0              & \cdots & b_e
\end{pmatrix}\ ,$$
having $e$ columns of $a_i$ and $d$ columns of $b_j$. Its determinant is the resultant $\mathop{\rm res}(A,B)$. (Note: Original Sylvester's definition and the definition given in Sylvester matrix are the transpose of this matrix; both definitions of the Sylvester matrix give the same resultant.)

For $d=3$ and $e=2$, the resultant is:
$$\begin{vmatrix}
a_0    & 0     & b_0   & 0    & 0 \\
a_1    & a_0   & b_1   & b_0  & 0  \\
a_2    & a_1   & b_2   & b_1  & b_0 \\
a_3    & a_2   & 0     & b_2  & b_1 \\
0      & a_3   & 0     & 0    & b_2
\end{vmatrix}
= \begin{array}{c}
a_3^2 b_0^3 - a_2 a_3 b_1 b_0^2 + a_2^2 b_2 b_0^2 - 2 a_1 a_3 b_2 b_0^2 \\[.5em]
+\, a_1 a_3 b_1^2 b_0 + a_1^2 b_2^2 b_0 - 2 a_0 a_2 b_2^2 b_0 - a_1 a_2 b_1 b_2 b_0 \\[.5em]
+\, 3 a_0 a_3 b_1 b_2 b_0 - a_0 a_3 b_1^3 + a_0^2 b_2^3 - a_0 a_1 b_1 b_2^2 + a_0 a_2 b_1^2 b_2.
\end{array}$$
Assuming the coefficient ring $F$ is a field (or an integral domain, which can be extended to a field), let $\lambda_1, \dots, \lambda_d$ and $\mu_1,\dots,\mu_e$ be respectively the roots (listed with multiplicities) of $A$ and $B$ in an algebraically closed field extension of $F$. (For integer coefficients, the roots may be considered as complex numbers.) Then the resultant can be written as:
$$\operatorname{res}(A, B) = a_0^e b_0^d \prod_{\begin{array}{c}1 \leq i \leq d\\ 1 \leq j \leq e\end{array}} (\lambda_i-\mu_j) = a_0^e \prod_{i=1}^d B(\lambda_i) = (-1)^{de} b_0^d \prod_{j=1}^e A(\mu_j).$$
This is a straightforward consequence of the characterizing properties below.

== Properties ==
Again let $A$ and $B$ be polynomials in $x$ of respective degrees $d$ and $e$ with resultant $\operatorname{res}(A,B).$

=== Characterizing properties ===
The following properties hold for polynomials with coefficients in a commutative ring $R$. If $R$ is a field or more generally an integral domain, the resultant is the unique function of the coefficients of two polynomials that satisfies these properties.

- If R is a subring of another ring S, then $\operatorname{res}_R(A,B) = \operatorname{res}_S(A,B).$ That is A and B have the same resultant when considered as polynomials over R or S.
- If d = 0 (that is if $A=a_0$ is a nonzero constant) then $\operatorname{res}(A,B) = a_0^e$; and if e = 0, then $\operatorname{res}(A,B) = b_0^d.$
- $\operatorname{res}(x+a_1, x+b_1) = b_1-a_1$
- $\operatorname{res}(B,A)=(-1)^{de} \operatorname{res}(A,B)$
- $\operatorname{res}(AB,C) = \operatorname{res}(A,C)\operatorname{res}(B,C)$

=== Zeros ===
- The resultant of two polynomials with coefficients in an integral domain D is zero if and only if they have a common divisor of positive degree over the field of fractions of D. (Note: Note that if D is not a UFD, there may be polynomials $A$, $B$ with $\operatorname{res}(A,B)=0$, but with no common factors of positive degree in D. One example in $\mathbf{Z}\left[\sqrt{-5}\right]$ is $A=2x-(1+i\sqrt{5})$, $B= (1+i\sqrt{5})x-(-2+i\sqrt{5})$, with a common root of $(1+i\sqrt{5})/2$ but without common factors ≠ 1,-1.)
- The resultant of two polynomials with coefficients in an integral domain is zero if and only if they have a common root in an algebraically closed field containing the coefficients.
- There exists a polynomial P of degree less than e and a polynomial Q of degree less than d such that $\operatorname{res}(A,B)=AP+BQ.$ This is a generalization of Bézout's identity to polynomials over an arbitrary commutative ring. In other words, the resultant of two polynomials belongs to the ideal generated by these polynomials.

=== Invariance by ring homomorphisms ===
Let A and B be two polynomials of respective degrees d and e with coefficients in a commutative ring R, and $\varphi\colon R\to S$ a ring homomorphism of R into another commutative ring S. Applying $\varphi$ to the coefficients of a polynomial extends $\varphi$ to a homomorphism of polynomial rings $R[x]\to S[x]$, which is also denoted $\varphi.$ With this notation, we have:

- If $\varphi$ preserves the degrees of A and B (that is if $\deg(\varphi(A)) = d$ and $\deg(\varphi(B)) = e$), then
  $$\varphi(\operatorname{res}(A,B)) = \operatorname{res}(\varphi(A), \varphi(B)).$$
- If $\deg(\varphi(A)) < d$ and $\deg(\varphi(B))< e,$ then
  $$\varphi(\operatorname{res}(A,B)) = 0.$$
- If $\deg(\varphi(A)) = d$ and $\deg(\varphi(B)) =f < e,$ and the leading coefficient of A is $a_0$ then
  $$\varphi(\operatorname{res}(A,B))=\varphi(a_0)^{e-f}\operatorname{res}(\varphi(A), \varphi(B)).$$
- If $\deg(\varphi(A)) = f<d$ and $\deg(\varphi(B)) = e,$ and the leading coefficient of B is $b_0$ then
  $$\varphi(\operatorname{res}(A,B)) = (-1)^{e(d-f)}\varphi(b_0)^{d-f}\operatorname{res}(\varphi(A), \varphi(B)).$$

These properties are easily deduced from the definition of the resultant as a determinant. They are mainly used in two situations. For computing a resultant of polynomials with integer coefficients, it is generally faster to compute it modulo several primes and to retrieve the desired resultant with Chinese remainder theorem. When R is a polynomial ring in other indeterminates, and S is the ring obtained by specializing to numerical values some or all indeterminates of R, these properties may be restated as if the degrees are preserved by the specialization, the resultant of the specialization of two polynomials is the specialization of the resultant. This property is fundamental, for example, for cylindrical algebraic decomposition.

=== Invariance under change of variable ===
- $\operatorname{res}(A(x+a), B(x+a)) = \operatorname{res}(A(x), B(x))$
- $\operatorname{res}(A(ax), B(ax)) = a^{de}\operatorname{res}(A(x), B(x))$
- If $A_r(x) = x^d A(1/x)$ and $B_r(x) = x^e B(1/x)$ are the reciprocal polynomials of A and B, respectively, then
  $$\operatorname{res}(A_r, B_r) = (-1)^{de} \operatorname{res}(A,B)$$

This means that the property of the resultant being zero is invariant under linear and projective changes of the variable.

=== Invariance under change of polynomials ===
- If a and b are nonzero constants (that is they are independent of the indeterminate x), and A and B are as above, then
  $$\operatorname{res}(aA,bB) =a^eb^d\operatorname{res}(A,B).$$
- If A and B are as above, and C is another polynomial such that the degree of A – CB is δ, then
  $$\operatorname{res}(B, A-CB)=b_0^{\delta-d}\operatorname{res}(B,A).$$

It is only when $CB$ and $A$ have the same degree that $\delta$ cannot be deduced from the degrees of the given polynomials. If either B is monic, or deg C < deg A – deg B, then
$$\operatorname{res}(B,A-CB) = \operatorname{res}(B,A),$$
If f = deg C > deg A – deg B = d – e, then
$$\operatorname{res}(B,A-CB)=b_0^{e+f-d}\operatorname{res}(B,A).$$

These properties imply that in the Euclidean algorithm for polynomials, and all its variants (pseudo-remainder sequences), the resultant of two successive remainders (or pseudo-remainders) differs from the resultant of the initial polynomials by a factor which is easy to compute. Keeping track of successive factors allows one to compute the resultant of the initial polynomials from the value of the last remainder or pseudo-remainder. This is the starting idea of the subresultant-pseudo-remainder-sequence algorithm, which uses the above formulae for getting subresultant polynomials as pseudo-remainders, and the resultant as the last nonzero pseudo-remainder (provided the resultant is non-zero). This algorithm works for polynomials over the integers or, more generally over an integral domain, without any division other than exact divisions (that is, without involving fractions). It requires only $O(de)$ arithmetic operations, while the computation of the determinant of the Sylvester matrix with standard algorithms requires $O((d+e)^3)$ arithmetic operations.

=== Generic properties ===
In this section, we consider two polynomials
$$A = a_0x^d +a_1x^{d-1} + \cdots + a_d$$
and
$$B = b_0x^e +b_1x^{e-1} + \cdots + b_e$$
whose d + e + 2 coefficients are distinct indeterminates. Let
$$R = \mathbb{Z}[a_0, \ldots, a_d, b_0, \ldots, b_e]$$
be the polynomial ring over the integers defined by these indeterminates. The resultant $\operatorname{res}(A,B)$ is the generic resultant for degrees d and e. It has the following properties.

- $\operatorname{res}(A,B)$ is an absolutely irreducible polynomial.
- If $I$ is the ideal of $R[x]$ generated by A and B, then $I\cap R$ is the principal ideal of $R$ generated by $\operatorname{res}(A,B)$.

=== Homogeneity ===
The generic resultant for the degrees d and e is homogeneous in various ways. More precisely:

- It is homogeneous of degree e in $a_0, \ldots, a_d.$
- It is homogeneous of degree d in $b_0, \ldots, b_e.$
- It is homogeneous of degree d + e in all the variables $a_i$ and $b_j.$
- If $a_i$ and $b_i$ are given the weight i (that is, the weight of each coefficient is its degree as elementary symmetric polynomial), then it is quasi-homogeneous of total weight de.
- If P and Q are homogeneous multivariate polynomials of respective degrees d and e, then their resultant in degrees d and e with respect to an indeterminate x, denoted $\operatorname{res}_x^{d,e}(P,Q)$ in § Notation, is homogeneous of degree de in the other indeterminates.

=== Elimination property ===
Let $I=\langle A, B\rangle$ be the ideal generated by two polynomials A and B in a polynomial ring $R[x],$ where $R=k[y_1,\ldots,y_n]$ is itself a polynomial ring over a field. If at least one of A and B is monic in x, then:

- $\operatorname{res}_x(A,B)\in I \cap R$
- The ideals $I\cap R$ and $R\operatorname{res}_x(A,B)$ define the same algebraic set. That is, a tuple of n elements of an algebraically closed field is a common zero of the elements of $I\cap R$ if and only it is a zero of $\operatorname{res}_x(A,B).$
- The ideal $I\cap R$ has the same radical as the principal ideal $R\operatorname{res}_x(A,B).$ That is, each element of $I\cap R$ has a power that is a multiple of $\operatorname{res}_x(A,B).$
- All irreducible factors of $\operatorname{res}_x(A,B)$ divide every element of $I\cap R.$

The first assertion is a basic property of the resultant. The other assertions are immediate corollaries of the second one, which can be proved as follows.

As at least one of A and B is monic, a tuple $(\beta_1,\ldots, \beta_n)$ is a zero of $\operatorname{res}_x(A,B)$ if and only if there exists $\alpha$ such that $(\beta_1,\ldots, \beta_n, \alpha)$ is a common zero of A and B. Such a common zero is also a zero of all elements of $I\cap R.$ Conversely, if $(\beta_1,\ldots, \beta_n)$ is a common zero of the elements of $I\cap R,$ it is a zero of the resultant, and there exists $\alpha$ such that $(\beta_1,\ldots, \beta_n, \alpha)$ is a common zero of A and B. So $I\cap R$ and $R\operatorname{res}_x(A,B)$ have exactly the same zeros.

== Computation ==
Naively, the resultant could be computed by using the formula expressing it as a product of root differences (with roots computed via Newton's method), but such an algorithm would be inefficient and numerically unstable. As the resultant is a symmetric function of the roots of each polynomial, it could also be expressed in terms of the coefficients of $A(x), B(x)$ by using the fundamental theorem of symmetric polynomials, but this would be highly inefficient. As the resultant is the determinant of the Sylvester matrix (and of the Bézout matrix), it may be computed using any algorithm for computing determinants. This needs $O(n^3)$ arithmetic operations, where $n=d+e$, but the more efficient methods below are preferred in practice.

Using the § Invariance under change of polynomials described above, the computation of a resultant can be done by a small augmentation of the Euclidean algorithm for polynomials, using only $O(de)$ arithmetic operations in the field of coefficients. However, when the coefficients are integers, rational numbers or polynomials, these arithmetic operations imply a number of GCD computations of coefficients which make the algorithm inefficient. The subresultant pseudo-remainder sequences were introduced to solve this problem and avoid any fraction or GCD computations with coefficients.

A more efficient algorithm is obtained by using the good behavior of the resultant under a ring homomorphism on the coefficients: to compute a resultant of two polynomials with integer coefficients, one computes their resultants modulo sufficiently many prime numbers and then reconstructs the integer value with the Chinese remainder theorem.

The use of fast multiplication of integers and polynomials allows algorithms for resultants and greatest common divisors that have a better time complexity, which is of the order of the complexity of the multiplication, multiplied by the logarithm of the size of the input ($\log(s(d+e)),$ where s is an upper bound of the number of digits of the input polynomials).

== Application to polynomial systems ==
Resultants were introduced for solving systems of polynomial equations and provide the oldest proof that there exist algorithms for solving such systems. These are primarily intended for systems of two equations in two unknowns, but also allow solving general systems.

=== Case of two equations in two unknowns ===
Consider the system of two polynomial equations
$$\begin{align}
P(x,y)&=0\\
Q(x,y)&=0,
\end{align}$$
where P and Q are polynomials of respective total degrees d and e. Then $R=\operatorname{res}_y^{d,e}(P,Q)$ is a polynomial in x, which is generically of degree de (by properties of § Homogeneity). A value $\alpha$ of x is a root of R if and only if either:

- $P(\alpha,y), Q(\alpha,y)$ have a common root at $y=\beta$ in an algebraically closed field containing the coefficients, meaning $P(\alpha,\beta) = Q(\alpha,\beta)=0$; or
- $P(\alpha,y), Q(\alpha,y)$ have a common root at $y=\infty$, meaning $\deg P(\alpha,y) <d$ and $\deg Q(\alpha,y) <e$.

Therefore, solutions to the system are obtained by computing the roots of $R=\operatorname{res}_y^{d,e}(P,Q)$, and for each root $x=\alpha$, computing the common roots $y=\beta$ of $P(\alpha,y),$ $Q(\alpha,y),$ and $\operatorname{res}_x(P,Q)$.

Bézout's theorem results from the value of $\deg\left(\operatorname{res}_y(P,Q)\right)\le de$, the product of the degrees of P and Q. In fact, after a linear change of variables, one may suppose that, for each root x of the resultant, there is exactly one value of y such that (x, y) is a common zero of P and Q. This shows that the number of common zeros is at most the degree of the resultant, i.e. at most the product of the degrees of P and Q. With some technicalities to count multiplicities and zeros at infinity, this shows that the number of common zeros is exactly the product of the degrees.

=== General case ===
At first glance, it seems that resultants may be applied to a general polynomial system of equations
$$\begin{align}
P_1(x_1, \ldots, x_n) &= 0 \\
&\;\;\vdots \\
P_k(x_1, \ldots, x_n) &= 0
\end{align}$$
by computing the resultants of every pair $(P_i,P_j)$ with respect to $x_n$ for eliminating one unknown, and repeating the process until getting univariate polynomials. Unfortunately, this introduces many spurious solutions, which are difficult to remove.

A method, introduced at the end of the 19th century, works as follows: introduce k − 1 new indeterminates $U_2, \ldots, U_k$ and compute
$$\operatorname{res}_{x_n}(P_1, U_2P_2 +\cdots +U_kP_k).$$
This is a polynomial in $U_2, \ldots, U_k$ whose coefficients are polynomials in $x_1, \ldots, x_{n-1},$ which have the property that $\alpha_1, \ldots, \alpha_{n-1}$ is a common zero of these polynomial coefficients, if and only if the univariate polynomials $P_i(\alpha_1, \ldots, \alpha_{n-1}, x_n)$ have a common zero, possibly at infinity. This process may be iterated until finding univariate polynomials.

To get a correct algorithm two complements have to be added to the method. Firstly, at each step, a linear change of variable may be needed in order that the degrees of the polynomials in the last variable are the same as their total degree. Secondly, if, at any step, the resultant is zero, this means that the polynomials have a common factor and that the solutions split in two components: one where the common factor is zero, and the other which is obtained by factoring out this common factor before continuing.

This algorithm is very complicated and has a huge time complexity. Therefore, its interest is mainly historical.

== Other applications ==
=== Number theory ===
The discriminant of a polynomial, which is a fundamental tool in number theory, is $a_0^{-1} (-1)^{n(n - 1)/2}\operatorname{res}_x(f(x), f'(x))$, where $a_0$ is the leading coefficient of $f(x)$ and $n$ its degree.

If $\alpha$ and $\beta$ are algebraic numbers such that $P(\alpha) = Q(\beta) = 0$, then $y = \alpha+\beta$ is a root of the resultant $\operatorname{res}_x(P(x),Q(y-x)),$ and $y = \alpha\beta$ is a root of $\operatorname{res}_x(P(x),x^nQ(y/x))$, where $n$ is the degree of $Q(y)$. Combined with the fact that $y=1/\beta$ is a root of $y^n Q(1/y)$, this shows that the set of algebraic numbers is a field.

Let $K(\alpha)$ be an algebraic field extension generated by an element $\alpha$ whose minimal polynomial is $P(x)$. Every element of $\beta \in K(\alpha)$ may be written as $\beta = Q(\alpha),$ where $Q$ is a polynomial. Then $y=\beta$ is a root of $\operatorname{res}_x(P(x),y-Q(x))$.

=== Algebraic geometry ===
Given two plane algebraic curves defined as the zeros of the polynomials P(x, y) and Q(x, y), the resultant allows the computation of their intersection. More precisely, the roots of $\operatorname{res}_y(P,Q)$ are the x-coordinates of the intersection points and of the common vertical asymptotes, and the roots of $\operatorname{res}_x(P,Q)$ are the y-coordinates of the intersection points and of the common horizontal asymptotes.

A rational plane curve may be defined by a parametric equation
$$x = \frac{P(t)}{R(t)},\qquad
y = \frac{Q(t)}{R(t)},$$
where P, Q and R are polynomials. An implicit equation of the curve is given by
$$\operatorname{res}_t(x R - P, y R - Q).$$
The degree of this curve is the highest degree of P, Q and R, which is equal to the total degree of the resultant.

=== Symbolic integration ===
In symbolic integration, to compute the antiderivative of a rational fraction one uses partial fraction decomposition of the integrand, producing a "rational part" which is a sum of rational fractions whose antiderivatives are rational fractions, and a "logarithmic part" which is a sum of rational fractions of the form $\tfrac{P(x)}{Q(x)}$ where Q is a square-free polynomial and P is a polynomial of lower degree than Q. The antiderivative of the logarithmic part is:
$$\int \frac{P(x)}{Q(x)}\, dx = \sum_{Q(\alpha)=0} \frac{P(\alpha)}{Q'(\alpha)} \log(x-\alpha),$$
where the sum runs over all complex roots of Q.

This usually involves all the algebraic numbers which are roots of Q, but one may often find an expression involving fewer algebraic numbers. The Lazard–Rioboo–Trager method efficiently produces an expression using the fewest possible algebraic numbers.

Let
$$S_1(r) S_2(r)^2 \cdots S_k(r)^k = \operatorname{res}_r (rQ'(x)-P(x), Q(x))$$
where $S_i(x)$ are square-free, be the square-free factorization of the resultant on the right side. Trager proved that the antiderivative is
$$\int \frac{P(x)}{Q(x)}\,dx = \sum_{i=1}^k\sum_{S_i(\alpha)=0} \alpha \log(T_i(\alpha,x)),$$
where the internal sums run over the roots of the $S_i$ (if $S_i=1$ the sum is zero), and $T_i(r,x)$ is a polynomial of degree i in x. Lazard-Rioboo showed that $T_i(r,x)$ is the subresultant of degree i of $rQ'(x)-P(x)$ and $Q(x)$, which is obtained as a by-product of the subresultant pseudo-remainder sequence for computing the resultant.

=== Computer algebra ===
All preceding applications, and many others, show that the resultant is a fundamental tool in computer algebra. In fact most computer algebra systems include an efficient implementation of the computation of resultants.

== Homogeneous resultant ==
The resultant is also defined for two homogeneous polynomials P(x, y) and Q(x, y) in two indeterminates, of respective total degrees p and q; their homogeneous resultant is the determinant of the matrix over the monomial basis of the linear map
$$(A,B) \mapsto AP+BQ,$$
where A runs over the bivariate homogeneous polynomials of degree q − 1, and B runs over the homogeneous polynomials of degree p − 1. In other words, the homogeneous resultant of P and Q is the resultant of P(x, 1) and Q(x, 1) when they are considered as polynomials of degree p and q (their degree in x may be lower than their total degree):
$$\operatorname{Res}(P(x,y),Q(x,y)) = \operatorname{res}_{p,q}(P(x,1),Q(x,1)).$$
(The capitalized "Res" is used here to distinguish the homogeneous resultant from the usual version, though there is no standard notation for these.)

The homogeneous resultant has essentially the same properties as the usual resultant, with two differences: instead of ordinary roots $x=\alpha$, one considers zeros $(x\,:y)=(\alpha\,:\beta)$in the projective line, and the degree of a polynomial may not change under a ring homomorphism. That is:

- The resultant of two homogeneous polynomials over an integral domain is zero if and only if they have a non-zero common zero over an algebraically closed field containing the coefficients.
- If P and Q are two bivariate homogeneous polynomials with coefficients in a commutative ring R, and $\varphi\colon R\to S$ a ring homomorphism of R into another commutative ring S, then extending $\varphi$ to polynomials over R, ones has
  $$\operatorname{Res}(\varphi(P), \varphi(Q)) = \varphi(\operatorname{Res}(P,Q)).$$
- The property of a homogeneous resultant being zero is invariant under any projective change of variables.

Any property of the usual resultant may similarly extended to the homogeneous resultant, and the resulting property is either very similar or simpler than the corresponding property of the usual resultant.

== Macaulay's resultant ==
Macaulay's resultant, named after Francis Sowerby Macaulay, also called the multivariate resultant, or the multipolynomial resultant, is a generalization of the homogeneous resultant to n homogeneous polynomials in n indeterminates. Macaulay's resultant is a polynomial in the coefficients of these n homogeneous polynomials that vanishes if and only if the polynomials have a common non-zero solution in an algebraically closed field containing the coefficients, or, equivalently, if the n hyper surfaces defined by the polynomials have a common zero in the n –1 dimensional projective space. The multivariate resultant is, with Gröbner bases, one of the main tools of effective elimination theory (elimination theory on computers).

Like the homogeneous resultant, Macaulay's may be defined with determinants, and thus behaves well under ring homomorphisms. However, it cannot be defined by a single determinant. It follows that it is easier to define it first on generic polynomials.

=== Resultant of generic homogeneous polynomials ===
A homogeneous polynomial of degree d in n variables may have up to
$$\binom{n+d-1}{n-1}=\frac{(n+d-1)!}{(n-1)!\,d!}$$
coefficients; it is said to be generic, if these coefficients are distinct indeterminates.

Let $P_1, \ldots, P_n$ be n generic homogeneous polynomials in n indeterminates, of respective degrees $d_1, \dots, d_n.$ Together, they involve
$$\sum_{i=1}^n\binom{n+d_i-1}{n-1}$$
indeterminate coefficients. Let C be the polynomial ring over the integers, in all these indeterminate coefficients. The polynomials $P_1, \ldots, P_n$ belong thus to $C[x_1,\ldots, x_n],$ and their resultant (still to be defined) belongs to C.

The Macaulay degree is the integer $D=d_1+\cdots+d_n-n+1,$ which is fundamental in Macaulay's theory. For defining the resultant, one considers the Macaulay matrix, which is the matrix over the monomial basis of the C-linear map
$$(Q_1, \ldots, Q_n)\mapsto Q_1P_1+\cdots+Q_nP_n,$$
in which each $Q_i$ runs over the homogeneous polynomials of degree $D-d_i,$ and the codomain is the C-module of the homogeneous polynomials of degree D.

If n = 2, the Macaulay matrix is the Sylvester matrix, and is a square matrix, but this is no longer true for n > 2. Thus, instead of considering the determinant, one considers all the maximal minors, that is the determinants of the square submatrices that have as many rows as the Macaulay matrix. Macaulay proved that the C-ideal generated by these principal minors is a principal ideal, which is generated by the greatest common divisor of these minors. As one is working with polynomials with integer coefficients, this greatest common divisor is defined up to its sign. The generic Macaulay resultant is the greatest common divisor which becomes 1, when, for each i, zero is substituted for all coefficients of $P_i,$ except the coefficient of $x_i^{d_i},$ for which one is substituted.

==== Properties of the generic Macaulay resultant ====
- The generic Macaulay resultant is an irreducible polynomial.
- It is homogeneous of degree $B/d_i$ in the coefficients of $P_i,$ where $B=d_1 \cdots d_n$ is the Bézout bound.
- The product with the resultant of every monomial of degree D in $x_1,\dots, x_n$ belongs to the ideal of $C[x_1,\dots,x_n]$ generated by $P_1,\dots,P_n.$

=== Resultant of polynomials over a field ===
From now on, we consider that the homogeneous polynomials $P_1,\ldots,P_n$ of degrees $d_1,\ldots,d_n$ have their coefficients in a field k, that is that they belong to $k[x_1,\dots,x_n].$ Their resultant is defined as the element of k obtained by replacing in the generic resultant the indeterminate coefficients by the actual coefficients of the $P_i.$

The main property of the resultant is that it is zero if and only if $P_1,\ldots,P_n$ have a nonzero common zero in an algebraically closed extension of k.

The "only if" part of this theorem results from the last property of the preceding paragraph, and is an effective version of projective Nullstellensatz: If the resultant is nonzero, then
$$\langle x_1,\ldots, x_n\rangle^D \subseteq \langle P_1,\ldots,P_n\rangle,$$
where $D=d_1+\cdots +d_n-n+1$ is the Macaulay degree, and $\langle x_1,\ldots, x_n\rangle$ is the maximal homogeneous ideal. This implies that $P_1,\ldots,P_n$ have no other common zero than the unique common zero, (0, ..., 0), of $x_1,\ldots,x_n.$

=== Computability ===
As the computation of a resultant may be reduced to computing determinants and polynomial greatest common divisors, there are algorithms for computing resultants in a finite number of steps.

However, the generic resultant is a polynomial of very high degree (exponential in n) depending on a huge number of indeterminates. It follows that, except for very small n and very small degrees of input polynomials, the generic resultant is, in practice, impossible to compute, even with modern computers. Moreover, the number of monomials of the generic resultant is so high, that, if it would be computable, the result could not be stored on available memory devices, even for rather small values of n and of the degrees of the input polynomials.

Therefore, computing the resultant makes sense only for polynomials whose coefficients belong to a field or are polynomials in few indeterminates over a field.

In the case of input polynomials with coefficients in a field, the exact value of the resultant is rarely important, only its equality (or not) to zero matters. As the resultant is zero if and only if the rank of the Macaulay matrix is lower than its number of its rows, this equality to zero may by tested by applying Gaussian elimination to the Macaulay matrix. This provides a computational complexity $d^{O(n)},$ where d is the maximum degree of input polynomials.

Another case where the computation of the resultant may provide useful information is when the coefficients of the input polynomials are polynomials in a small number of indeterminates, often called parameters. In this case, the resultant, if not zero, defines a hypersurface in the parameter space. A point belongs to this hyper surface, if and only if there are values of $x_1, \ldots,x_n$ which, together with the coordinates of the point are a zero of the input polynomials. In other words, the resultant is the result of the "elimination" of $x_1, \ldots,x_n$ from the input polynomials.

=== U-resultant ===
Macaulay's resultant provides a method, called "U-resultant" by Macaulay, for solving systems of polynomial equations.

Given n − 1 homogeneous polynomials $P_1, \ldots, P_{n-1},$ of degrees $d_1, \ldots, d_{n-1},$ in n indeterminates $x_1, \ldots, x_n,$ over a field k, their U-resultant is the resultant of the n polynomials $P_1, \ldots, P_{n-1}, P_n,$ where
$$P_n = u_1 x_1 + \cdots + u_n x_n$$
is the generic linear form whose coefficients are new indeterminates $u_1, \ldots, u_n.$ Notation $u_i$ or $U_i$ for these generic coefficients is traditional, and is the origin of the term U-resultant.

The U-resultant is a homogeneous polynomial in $k[u_1, \ldots, u_n].$ It is zero if and only if the common zeros of $P_1, \ldots, P_{n-1}$ form a projective algebraic set of positive dimension (that is, there are infinitely many projective zeros over an algebraically closed extension of k). If the U-resultant is not zero, its degree is the Bézout bound $d_1\cdots d_{n-1}.$ The U-resultant factorizes over an algebraically closed extension of k into a product of linear forms. If $\alpha_1u_1+\ldots+\alpha_nu_n$ is such a linear factor, then $\alpha_1, \ldots, \alpha_n$ are the homogeneous coordinates of a common zero of $P_1, \ldots, P_{n-1}.$ Moreover, every common zero may be obtained from one of these linear factors, and the multiplicity as a factor is equal to the intersection multiplicity of the $P_i$ at this zero. In other words, the U-resultant provides a completely explicit version of Bézout's theorem.

==== Extension to more polynomials and computation ====
The U-resultant as defined by Macaulay requires the number of homogeneous polynomials in the system of equations to be $n-1$, where $n$ is the number of indeterminates. In 1981, Daniel Lazard extended the notion to the case where the number of polynomials may differ from $n-1$, and the resulting computation can be performed via a specialized Gaussian elimination procedure followed by symbolic determinant computation.

Let $P_1, \ldots, P_k$ be homogeneous polynomials in $x_1, \ldots, x_n,$ of degrees $d_1, \ldots, d_k,$ over a field k. Without loss of generality, one may suppose that $d_1\ge d_2\ge \cdots \ge d_k.$ Setting $d_i=1$ for i > k, the Macaulay bound is $D=d_1+\cdots + d_n-n+1.$

Let $u_1, \ldots, u_n$ be new indeterminates and define $P_{k+1}=u_1x_1+\cdots +u_nx_n.$ In this case, the Macaulay matrix is defined to be the matrix, over the basis of the monomials in $x_1, \ldots, x_n,$ of the linear map
$$(Q_1, \ldots, Q_{k+1}) \mapsto P_1Q_1+\cdots+P_{k+1}Q_{k+1},$$
where, for each i, $Q_i$ runs over the linear space consisting of zero and the homogeneous polynomials of degree $D-d_i$.

Reducing the Macaulay matrix by a variant of Gaussian elimination, one obtains a square matrix of linear forms in $u_1, \ldots, u_n.$ The determinant of this matrix is the U-resultant. As with the original U-resultant, it is zero if and only if $P_1, \ldots, P_k$ have infinitely many common projective zeros (that is if the projective algebraic set defined by $P_1, \ldots, P_k$ has infinitely many points over an algebraic closure of k). Again as with the original U-resultant, when this U-resultant is not zero, it factorizes into linear factors over any algebraically closed extension of k. The coefficients of these linear factors are the homogeneous coordinates of the common zeros of $P_1, \ldots, P_k,$ and the multiplicity of a common zero equals the multiplicity of the corresponding linear factor.

The number of rows of the Macaulay matrix is less than $(ed)^n,$ where e ~ 2.7182 is the usual mathematical constant, and d is the arithmetic mean of the degrees of the $P_i.$ It follows that all solutions of a system of polynomial equations with a finite number of projective zeros can be determined in time $d^{O(n)}.$ Although this bound is large, it is nearly optimal in the following sense: if all input degrees are equal, then the time complexity of the procedure is polynomial in the expected number of solutions (Bézout's theorem). This computation may be practically viable when n, k and d are not large.

== See also ==
- Elimination theory
- Subresultant
- Nonlinear algebra
