= Elimination theory =

Part of algebraic geometry devoted to the elimination of variables between polynomials

In commutative algebra and algebraic geometry, elimination theory is the classical name for algorithmic approaches to eliminating some variables between polynomials of several variables, in order to solve systems of polynomial equations.

Classical elimination theory culminated with the work of Francis Macaulay on multivariate resultants, as described in the chapter on Elimination theory in the first editions (1930) of Bartel van der Waerden's Moderne Algebra. After that, elimination theory was ignored by most algebraic geometers for almost thirty years, until the introduction of new methods for solving polynomial equations, such as Gröbner bases, which were needed for computer algebra.

== History and connection to modern theories ==
The field of elimination theory was motivated by the need of methods for solving systems of polynomial equations.

One of the first results was Bézout's theorem, which bounds the number of solutions.

Except for Bézout's theorem, the general approach was to eliminate variables for reducing the problem to a single equation in one variable.

The case of linear equations was completely solved by Gaussian elimination, an improvement over the older method of Cramer's rule, which does not proceed by elimination, and works only when the number of equations equals the number of variables. In the 19th century, this was extended to linear Diophantine equations and abelian groups with the Hermite normal form and Smith normal form.

Before the 20th century, different types of eliminants were introduced, including resultants, and various kinds of discriminants. In general, these eliminants are also invariant under various changes of variables, and are also fundamental in invariant theory.

All these concepts are effective, in the sense that their definitions include a method of computation. Around 1890, David Hilbert introduced non-effective methods, and this was seen as a revolution, which led most algebraic geometers of the first half of the 20th century to try to "eliminate elimination". Nevertheless, Hilbert's Nullstellensatz may be considered to belong to elimination theory, as it asserts that a system of polynomial equations does not have any solution if and only if one may eliminate all unknowns to obtain the constant equation 1 = 0.

Elimination theory culminated with the work of Leopold Kronecker, and finally Macaulay, who introduced multivariate resultants and U-resultants, providing complete elimination methods for systems of polynomial equations, which are described in the chapter on Elimination theory in the first editions (1930) of van der Waerden's Moderne Algebra.

Later, elimination theory was considered old-fashioned and removed from subsequent editions of Moderne Algebra. It was generally ignored until the introduction of computers, and more specifically of computer algebra, which again made relevant the design of efficient elimination algorithms, rather than merely existence and structural results. The main methods for this renewal of elimination theory are Gröbner bases and cylindrical algebraic decomposition, introduced around 1970.

== Connection to logic ==
There is also a logical facet to elimination theory, as seen in the Boolean satisfiability problem. In the worst case, it is presumably hard to eliminate variables computationally. Quantifier elimination is a term used in mathematical logic to explain that, in some theories, every formula is equivalent to a formula without quantifiers. This is the case of the theory of polynomials over an algebraically closed field, where elimination theory may be viewed as the theory of the methods to make quantifier elimination algorithmically effective. Quantifier elimination over the reals is another example, which is fundamental in computational algebraic geometry.

== See also ==
- Buchberger's algorithm
- Faugère's F4 and F5 algorithms
- Resultant
- Triangular decomposition
- Main theorem of elimination theory
