= Étienne Bézout =

French mathematician (1730–1783)

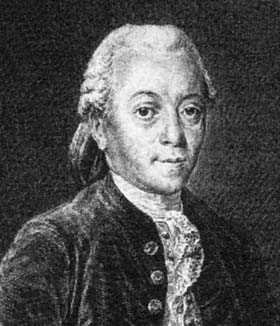
- Born: 31 March 1730; Nemours, Seine-et-Marne
- Died: 27 September 1783 (aged 53); Avon, Île-de-France
- Known for: Bézout's theorem Bézout's identity Bézout matrix Bézout domain
- Parents: Pierre Bézout (father); Jeanne-Hélène Filz (mother)
- Scientific career
- Fields: Mathematics
- Institutions: French Academy of Sciences

Étienne Bézout (French: [bezu]; 31 March 1730 – 27 September 1783) was a French mathematician who was born in Nemours, Seine-et-Marne, France, and died in Avon (near Fontainebleau), France.

== Early life ==
Étienne Bézout was the second son of Pierre Bézout and Jeanne-Hélène Filz. His family was well-connected politically, and both his father and grandfather had served as district magistrates. Bézout, who was deeply influenced by Leonhard Euler at an early age, chose to pursue a career in mathematics. At the age of 19 (in 1758), Bézout was elected an adjoint in mechanics of the French Academy of Sciences. He got married at the age of 24.

== Career ==
Bézout's marriage at the age of 24 led him to accept the position as a mathematics teacher and examiner of the Gardes de la Marine in 1763, the post being offered by the Duke of Choiseul. One important task that he was given in this role was to compose a textbook specially designed for teaching mathematics to the naval cadets. One of his most famous works came from this task: the Cours de mathématiques à l'usage des Gardes du Pavillon et de la Marine, a four volume work which appeared in 1764-1767. In 1768, Camus, who was the examiner for the artillery, died. Bézout was appointed to succeed him becoming examiner of the Corps d'Artillerie. Then, he began work on another mathematics textbook and as a result he produced Cours complet de mathématiques à l'usage de la marine et de l'artillerie, a six volume work which appeared between 1770 and 1782. In 1768, Bézout was promoted to associé in mechanics at the Académie des Sciences in 1768 and then further promoted to pensionnaire in 1770. Bézout is also acknowledged for his work on algebra, despite being much occupied with his teaching duties, leaving him with relatively little time for algebra research. He published many papers exploring algebraic equations, theory of equations and elimination theory, like the Sur plusieurs classes d'équations de tous les degrés qui admettent une solution algébrique, which examined how a single equation in a single unknown could be "attacked" by writing it as two equations in two unknowns. Many of Bézout's papers regarding theory of equations were gathered and published in possibly his most famous book, the Théorie générale des équations algébriques, published at Paris in 1779, which in particular contained much new and valuable matter on the theory of elimination and symmetrical functions of the roots of an equation: he used determinants in a paper in the Histoire de l'académie royale, 1764, but did not treat the general theory.

=== Publications ===
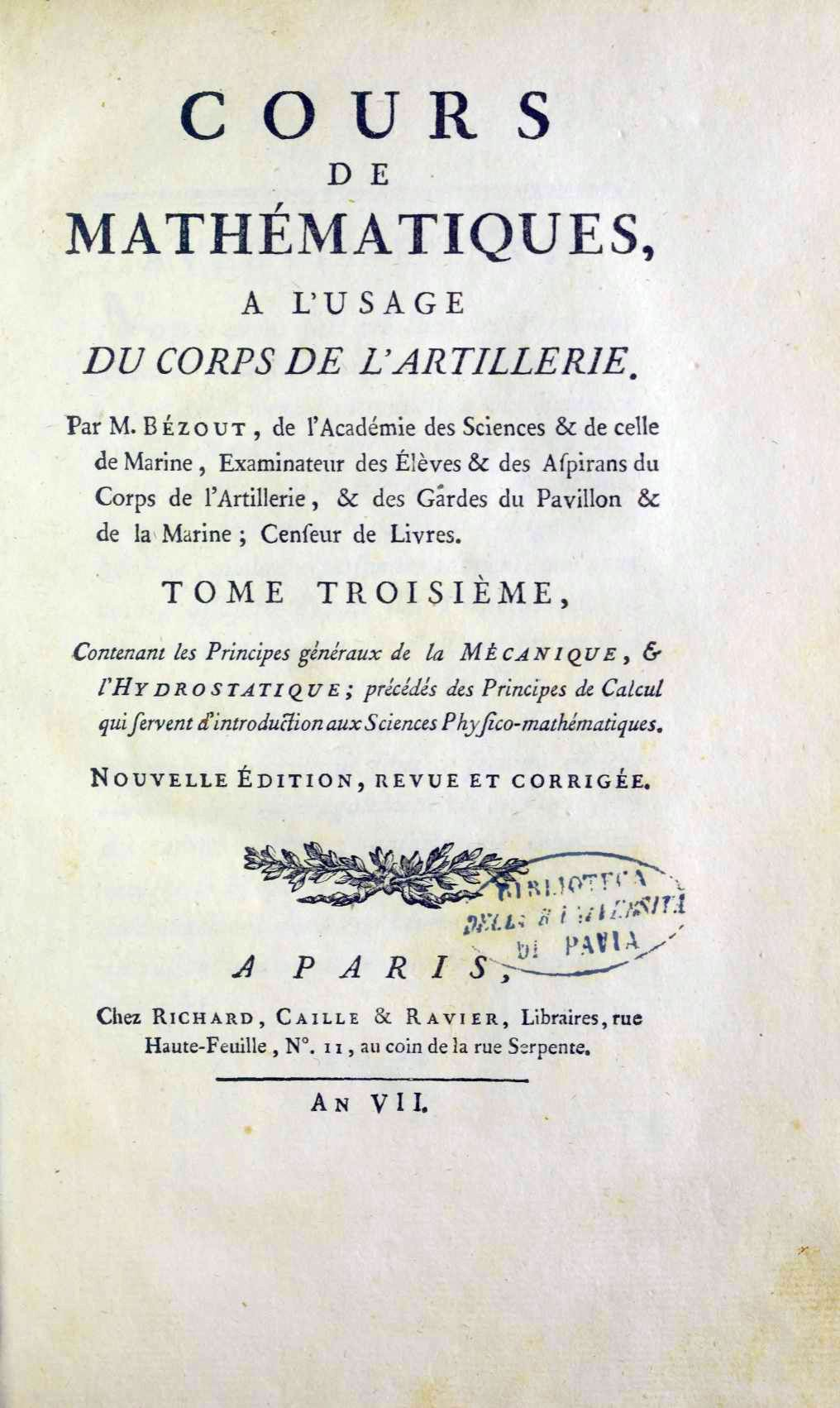
Cours de mathématiques, à l'usage du corps de l'artillerie, 1798

- Cours de mathématiques, a l'usage du corps de l'artillerie (in French). Vol. 3. Paris: Tilliard. 1798.
- Théorie générale des équations algébraiques. Paris: Ph.-D. Pierres. 1779.

== Legacy ==
After his death, a statue was erected in his birth town, Nemours, to commemorate his achievements.

In 2000, the minor planet 17285 Bezout was named after him.

== See also ==
- Little Bézout's theorem
- Bézout's theorem
- Bézout's identity
- Bézout matrix
- Bézout domain
