= Alicia Dickenstein =

Argentine mathematician

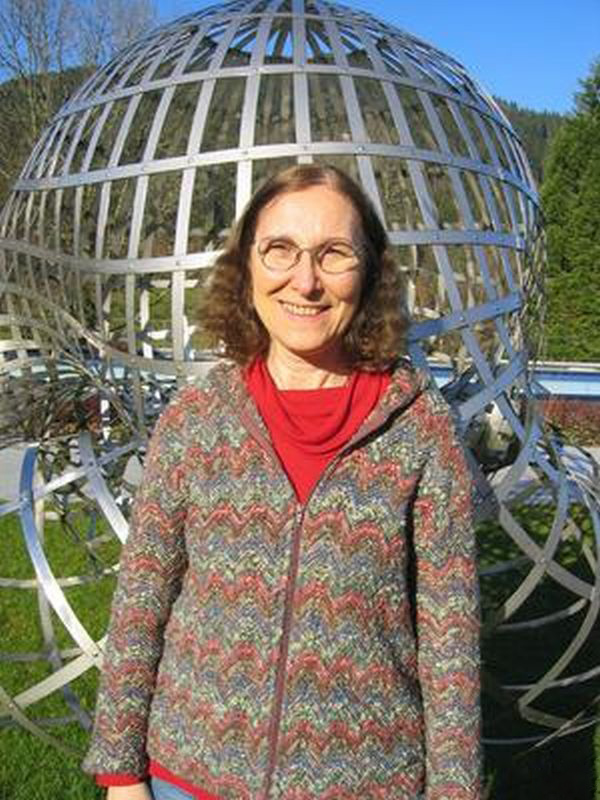
- Born: 17 January 1955 (age 71); Buenos Aires
- Education: University of Buenos Aires
- Awards: L'Oréal-UNESCO For Women in Science Awards 2021
- Scientific career
- Fields: Algebraic Geometry and Nonlinear Algebra
- Workplaces: University of Buenos Aires
- Doctoral advisor: Miguel E. M. Herrera

Alicia Dickenstein (born 17 January 1955, in Buenos Aires) is an Argentine mathematician known for her work on algebraic geometry, particularly toric geometry, tropical geometry, and their applications to biological systems. She is a full professor at the University of Buenos Aires, a 2019 Fellow of the American Mathematical Society, a former vice-president of the International Mathematical Union (2015–2018), and a 2015 recipient of The World Academy of Sciences prize.

== Research ==
Dickenstein is editor-in-chief of the journal Revista de la Unión Matemática Argentina. She is also a corresponding editor for the SIAM Journal on Applied Algebra and Geometry.

In 2009–2010, Dickenstein was an Eisenbud professor at MSRI, and in 2012–2013, she was a Simons professor at MSRI. In 2016, Dickenstein was a Knut and Alice Wallenbergs Professor at KTH.

Her research focuses on using Algebraic geometry and combinatorics to predict behaviours of Biological systems without knowing precise parameters. In joint work with Mercedes Pérez Millán, she created a system called The MESSI System (named after the footballer, Lionel Messi) which stands for Modifications of the type-Enzyme-Substrate or Swap with Intermediates. This allows researchers to prove general results valid in certain networks.

== Education ==
Dickenstein obtained her Ph.D. from the Universidad de Buenos Aires in 1982 under Miguel E. M. Herrera.

== Honors ==
In 2015, Dickenstein received the TWAS Prize from The World Academy of Sciences for the advancement of science in developing countries.

In 2018, Dickenstein was elected as a Fellow of the American Mathematical Society for "contributions to computational algebra and its applications, especially in systems biology, and for global leadership in supporting underrepresented groups in mathematics." That year, she was also named a Full Member of the National Academy of Exact, Physical and Natural Sciences of Argentina.

In 2020 she was named a SIAM Fellow "for contributions to algebraic geometry and its applications within geometric modeling and in the study of biochemical reaction networks".

In 2021, Dickenstein received the L’Oréal-UNESCO For Women in Science International Award for the Latin America and Caribbean region. She was "recognized for her outstanding contributions at the forefront of mathematical innovation by leveraging algebraic geometry in the field of molecular biology. Her research enables scientists to understand the structures and behavior of cells and molecules, even on a microscopic scale. Operating at the frontier between pure and applied mathematics, she has forged important links to physics and chemistry and enabled biologists to gain an in-depth structural understanding of biochemical reactions and enzymatic networks." Dickenstein became the 9th Argentine to win this award, and the first ever mathematician from the country to win. She shares the award with 5 women who have also been awarded a scientific Nobel Prize. This places Dickenstein into a category with other highly intelligent, innovative women.

In 2023 she was granted the Platinum Konex Award for her work in Mathematics in the last decade.

== Leadership ==
In 2021, Dickensen joined the SIAM Council as a Member-at-Large.

== Children's books ==
Dickenstein has produced several books for children, including Mate max: la matemática en todas partes, which presents mathematical problems designed for young children.
