= Sylvester matrix =

Used for the resultant of two polynomials

In mathematics, a Sylvester matrix is a matrix associated to two univariate polynomials that have coefficients in a commutative ring (such as an integral domain or a field). The entries of the Sylvester matrix of two polynomials are coefficients of the polynomials. The determinant of the Sylvester matrix of two polynomials is their resultant, which is zero when the two polynomials have a common root (in case of coefficients in a field) or a non-constant common divisor (in case of coefficients in an integral domain).

Sylvester matrices are named after James Joseph Sylvester who first used them in 1853.

== Definition ==
Formally, let p and q be two nonzero polynomials, respectively of degree m and n. Thus:

$$p(z)=p_0+p_1 z+p_2 z^2+\cdots+p_m z^m,\;q(z)=q_0+q_1 z+q_2 z^2+\cdots+q_n z^n.$$

The Sylvester matrix associated to p and q is then the $(n+m)\times(n+m)$ matrix constructed as follows:

- if n > 0, the first row is:

$$\begin{pmatrix} p_m & p_{m-1} & \cdots & p_1 & p_0 & 0 & \cdots & 0 \end{pmatrix}.$$

- the second row is the first row, shifted one column to the right; the first element of the row is zero.
- the following n − 2 rows are obtained the same way, shifting the coefficients one column to the right each time and setting the other entries in the row to be 0.
- if m > 0 the (n + 1)-th row is:

$$\begin{pmatrix} q_n & q_{n-1} & \cdots & q_1 & q_0 & 0 & \cdots & 0 \end{pmatrix}.$$

- the following rows are obtained the same way as before.

Thus, if m = 4 and n = 3, the matrix is:

$$S_{p,q}=\begin{pmatrix}
p_4 & p_3 & p_2 & p_1 & p_0 & 0 & 0 \\
0 & p_4 & p_3 & p_2 & p_1 & p_0 & 0 \\
0 & 0 & p_4 & p_3 & p_2 & p_1 & p_0 \\
q_3 & q_2 & q_1 & q_0 & 0 & 0 & 0 \\
0 & q_3 & q_2 & q_1 & q_0 & 0 & 0 \\
0 & 0 & q_3 & q_2 & q_1 & q_0 & 0 \\
0 & 0 & 0 & q_3 & q_2 & q_1 & q_0
\end{pmatrix}.$$

If one of the degrees is zero (that is, the corresponding polynomial is a nonzero constant polynomial), then there are zero rows consisting of coefficients of the other polynomial, and the Sylvester matrix is a diagonal matrix of dimension the degree of the non-constant polynomial, with the all diagonal coefficients equal to the constant polynomial. If m = n = 0, then the Sylvester matrix is the empty matrix with zero rows and zero columns, and a determinant (resultant) equal to 1.

== A variant ==
The above defined Sylvester matrix appears in a Sylvester paper of 1840. In a paper of 1853, Sylvester introduced the following matrix, which is, up to a permutation of the rows, the Sylvester matrix of p and q, which are both considered as having degree max(m, n). This is thus a $2\max(n, m)\times 2\max(n, m)$-matrix containing $\max(n, m)$ pairs of rows. Assuming $m > n,$ it is obtained as follows:

- the first pair is:

$$\begin{pmatrix}
p_m & p_{m-1} &\cdots & p_n  & \cdots   & p_1 & p_0 & 0 & \cdots & 0 \\
0      & \cdots    & 0        & q_n  &  \cdots & q_1 & q_0 & 0 & \cdots & 0
\end{pmatrix}.$$

- the second pair is the first pair, shifted one column to the right; the first elements in the two rows are zero.
- the remaining $max(n, m)-2$ pairs of rows are obtained the same way as above.

Thus, if m = 4 and n = 3, the matrix is:

$$\begin{pmatrix}
p_4 & p_3 & p_2 & p_1 & p_0 & 0 & 0 & 0\\
0    & q_3 & q_2 & q_1 & q_0 & 0  & 0 & 0\\
0    & p_4 & p_3 & p_2 & p_1 & p_0 & 0 & 0\\
0    & 0    & q_3 & q_2 & q_1 & q_0 & 0  & 0\\
0    & 0    & p_4 & p_3 & p_2 & p_1 & p_0 & 0\\
0    & 0    & 0    & q_3 & q_2 & q_1 & q_0 & 0\\
0    & 0    & 0    & p_4 & p_3 & p_2 & p_1 & p_0\\
0    & 0    & 0    & 0     & q_3 & q_2 & q_1 & q_0\\
\end{pmatrix}.$$

The determinant of the 1853 matrix is, up to sign, the product of the determinant of the Sylvester matrix (which is called the resultant of p and q) by $p_m^{m-n}$ (still supposing $m\ge n$).

== Applications ==
These matrices are used in commutative algebra, e.g. to test if two polynomials have a (non-constant) common factor. In such a case, the determinant of the associated Sylvester matrix (which is called the resultant of the two polynomials) equals zero. The converse is also true.

The solutions of the simultaneous linear equations

$${S_{p,q}}^\mathrm{T}\cdot\begin{pmatrix}x\\y\end{pmatrix} = \begin{pmatrix}0\\0\end{pmatrix}$$

where $x$ is a vector of size $n$ and $y$ has size $m$, comprise the coefficient vectors of those and only those pairs $x, y$ of polynomials (of degrees $n-1$ and $m-1$, respectively) which fulfill

$$x(z) \cdot p(z) + y(z) \cdot q(z) = 0,$$

where polynomial multiplication and addition is used. This means the kernel of the transposed Sylvester matrix gives all solutions of the Bézout equation where $\deg x < \deg q$ and $\deg y < \deg p$.

Consequently the rank of the Sylvester matrix determines the degree of the greatest common divisor of p and q:

$$\deg(\gcd(p,q)) = m+n-\operatorname{rank} S_{p,q}.$$

Moreover, the coefficients of this greatest common divisor may be expressed as determinants of submatrices of the Sylvester matrix (see Subresultant).

== See also ==
- Transfer matrix
- Bézout matrix
