= Nonlinear algebra =

Branch of mathematics

Nonlinear algebra is the nonlinear analogue to linear algebra, generalizing notions of spaces and transformations coming from the linear setting. Algebraic geometry is one of the main areas of mathematical research supporting nonlinear algebra, while major components coming from computational mathematics support the development of the area into maturity.

The topological setting for nonlinear algebra is typically the Zariski topology, where closed sets are the algebraic sets. Related areas in mathematics are tropical geometry, commutative algebra, and optimization.

== Algebraic geometry ==
Nonlinear algebra is closely related to algebraic geometry, where the main objects of study include algebraic equations, algebraic varieties, and schemes.

== Computational nonlinear algebra ==
Current methods in computational nonlinear algebra can be broadly broken into two domains: symbolic and numerical. Symbolic methods often rely on the computation of Gröbner bases and resultants. On the other hand, numerical methods typically use algebraically founded homotopy continuation, with a base field of the complex numbers.

== See also ==
- Algebraic equation
- Computational group theory
