= Quasi-homogeneous polynomial =

In algebra, a multivariate polynomial

$$f(x)=\sum_\alpha a_\alpha x^\alpha\text{, where }\alpha=(i_1,\dots,i_r)\in \mathbb{N}^r \text{, and } x^\alpha=x_1^{i_1} \cdots x_r^{i_r},$$

is quasi-homogeneous or weighted homogeneous, if there exist r integers $w_1, \ldots, w_r$, called weights of the variables, such that the sum $w=w_1i_1+ \cdots + w_ri_r$ is the same for all nonzero terms of f. This sum w is the weight or the degree of the polynomial.

The term quasi-homogeneous comes from the fact that a polynomial f is quasi-homogeneous if and only if

$$f(\lambda^{w_1} x_1, \ldots, \lambda^{w_r} x_r)=\lambda^w f(x_1,\ldots, x_r)$$

for every $\lambda$ in any field containing the coefficients.

A polynomial $f(x_1, \ldots, x_n)$ is quasi-homogeneous with weights $w_1, \ldots, w_r$ if and only if

$$f(y_1^{w_1}, \ldots, y_n^{w_n})$$

is a homogeneous polynomial in the $y_i$. In particular, a homogeneous polynomial is always quasi-homogeneous, with all weights equal to 1.

A polynomial is quasi-homogeneous if and only if all the $\alpha$ belong to the same affine hyperplane. As the Newton polytope of the polynomial is the convex hull of the set $\{\alpha \mid a_\alpha \neq0 \},$ the quasi-homogeneous polynomials may also be defined as the polynomials that have a degenerate Newton polytope (here "degenerate" means "contained in some affine hyperplane").

== Introduction ==
Consider the polynomial $f(x,y)=5x^3y^3+xy^9-2y^{12}$, which is not homogeneous. However, if instead of considering $f(\lambda x, \lambda y)$ we use the pair $(\lambda^3, \lambda)$ to test homogeneity, then

$$f(\lambda^3 x, \lambda y) = 5(\lambda^3x)^3(\lambda y)^3 + (\lambda^3x)(\lambda y)^9 - 2(\lambda y)^{12} = \lambda^{12}f(x,y).$$

We say that $f(x,y)$ is a quasi-homogeneous polynomial of type (3,1), because its three pairs (i_{1}, i_{2}) of exponents (3,3), (1,9) and (0,12) all satisfy the linear equation $3i_1+1i_2=12$. In particular, this says that the Newton polytope of $f(x,y)$ lies in the affine space with equation $3x+y = 12$ inside $\mathbb{R}^2$.

The above equation is equivalent to this new one: $\tfrac{1}{4}x + \tfrac{1}{12}y = 1$. Some authors prefer to use this last condition and prefer to say that our polynomial is quasi-homogeneous of type $(\tfrac{1}{4},\tfrac{1}{12})$.

As noted above, a homogeneous polynomial $g(x,y)$ of degree d is just a quasi-homogeneous polynomial of type (1,1); in this case all its pairs of exponents will satisfy the equation $1i_1+1i_2 = d$.

== Definition ==
Let $f(x)$ be a polynomial in r variables $x=x_1\ldots x_r$ with coefficients in a commutative ring R. We express it as a finite sum

$$f(x)=\sum_{\alpha\in\mathbb{N}^r} a_\alpha x^\alpha, \alpha=(i_1,\ldots,i_r), a_\alpha\in \mathbb{R}.$$

We say that f is quasi-homogeneous of type $\varphi=(\varphi_1,\ldots,\varphi_r)$, $\varphi_i\in\mathbb{N}$, if there exists some $a \in \mathbb{R}$ such that

$$\langle \alpha,\varphi \rangle = \sum_k^ri_k\varphi_k = a$$

whenever $a_\alpha\neq 0$.
