= Generic polynomial =

Polynomial with indeterminate coefficients

In mathematics, a generic polynomial refers usually to a polynomial whose coefficients are indeterminates. For example, if a, b, and c are indeterminates, the generic polynomial of degree two in x is $ax^2+bx+c.$

However in Galois theory, a branch of algebra, and in this article, the term generic polynomial has a different, although related, meaning: a generic polynomial for a finite group G and a field F is a monic polynomial P with coefficients in the field of rational functions L = F(t_{1}, ..., t_{n}) in n indeterminates over F, such that the splitting field M of P has Galois group G over L, and such that every extension K/F with Galois group G can be obtained as the splitting field of a polynomial which is the specialization of P resulting from setting the n indeterminates to n elements of F. This is sometimes called F-generic or relative to the field F; a Q-generic polynomial, which is generic relative to the rational numbers is called simply generic.

The existence, and especially the construction, of a generic polynomial for a given Galois group provides a complete solution to the inverse Galois problem for that group. However, not all Galois groups have generic polynomials, a counterexample being the cyclic group of order eight.

== Groups with generic polynomials ==
- The symmetric group S_{n}. This is trivial, as

$$x^n + t_1 x^{n-1} + \cdots + t_n$$

is a generic polynomial for S_{n}.

- Cyclic groups C_{n}, where n is not divisible by eight. Lenstra showed that a cyclic group does not have a generic polynomial if n is divisible by eight, and G. W. Smith explicitly constructs such a polynomial in case n is not divisible by eight.
- The cyclic group construction leads to other classes of generic polynomials; in particular the dihedral group D_{n} has a generic polynomial if and only if n is not divisible by eight.
- The quaternion group Q_{8}.
- Heisenberg groups $H_{p^3}$ for any odd prime p.
- The alternating group A_{4}.
- The alternating group A_{5}.
- Reflection groups defined over Q, including in particular groups of the root systems for E_{6}, E_{7}, and E_{8}.
- Any group which is a direct product of two groups both of which have generic polynomials.
- Any group which is a wreath product of two groups both of which have generic polynomials.

== Examples of generic polynomials ==
Group	Generic Polynomial
C_{2}	$x^2-t$
C_{3}	$x^3-tx^2+(t-3)x+1$
S_{3}	$x^3-t(x+1)$
V	$(x^2-s)(x^2-t)$
C_{4}	$x^4-2s(t^2+1)x^2+s^2t^2(t^2+1)$
D_{4}	$x^4 - 2stx^2 + s^2t(t-1)$
S_{4}	$x^4+sx^2-t(x+1)$
D_{5}	$x^5+(t-3)x^4+(s-t+3)x^3+(t^2-t-2s-1)x^2+sx+t$
S_{5}	$x^5+sx^3-t(x+1)$

Generic polynomials are known for all transitive groups of degree 5 or less.

== Generic dimension ==
The generic dimension for a finite group G over a field F, denoted $gd_{F}G$, is defined as the minimal number of parameters in a generic polynomial for G over F, or $\infty$ if no generic polynomial exists.

Examples:

- $gd_{\mathbb{Q}}A_3=1$
- $gd_{\mathbb{Q}}S_3=1$
- $gd_{\mathbb{Q}}D_4=2$
- $gd_{\mathbb{Q}}S_4=2$
- $gd_{\mathbb{Q}}D_5=2$
- $gd_{\mathbb{Q}}S_5=2$
