= Teo Mora =

Italian mathematician

Ferdinando 'Teo' Mora (Note: Teo Mora is his nickname, but used in most of his post-1980s publications; he has also used the pen name Theo Moriarty.) is an Italian mathematician, and since 1990 until 2019 a professor of algebra at the University of Genoa.

== Life and work ==
Mora's degree is in mathematics from the University of Genoa in 1974. Mora's publications span forty years; his notable contributions in computer algebra are the tangent cone algorithm and its extension of Buchberger theory of Gröbner bases and related algorithm earlier to non-commutative polynomial rings and more recently to effective rings; less significant the notion of Gröbner fan; marginal, with respect to the other authors, his contribution to the FGLM algorithm.

Mora is on the managing-editorial-board of the journal Applicable Algebra in Engineering, Communication and Computing published by Springer, and was also formerly an editor of the Bulletin of the Iranian Mathematical Society.

He is the author of the tetralogy Solving Polynomial Equation Systems:

- Solving Polynomial Equation Systems I: The Kronecker-Duval Philosophy, on equations in one variable
- Solving Polynomial Equation Systems II: Macaulay's paradigm and Gröbner technology, on equations in several variables
- Solving Polynomial Equation Systems III: Algebraic Solving,
- Solving Polynomial Equation Systems IV: Buchberger Theory and Beyond, on the Buchberger algorithm

== Personal life ==
Mora lives in Genoa. Mora published a book trilogy in 1977-1978 (reprinted 2001-2003) called Storia del cinema dell'orrore on the history of horror films. Italian television said in 2014 that the books are an "authoritative guide with in-depth detailed descriptions and analysis."

== See also ==
- FGLM algorithm, Buchberger's algorithm
- Gröbner fan, Gröbner basis
- Algebraic geometry#Computational algebraic geometry, System of polynomial equations
