= Gröbner fan =

In computer algebra, the Gröbner fan of an ideal in the ring of polynomials is a concept in the theory of Gröbner bases. It is defined to be a fan consisting of cones that correspond to different monomial orders on that ideal. The concept was introduced by Mora and Robbiano in 1988. The result is a weaker version of the result presented in the same issue of the journal by Bayer and Morrison. Gröbner fan is a base for the nowadays active field of tropical geometry. One implementation of the Gröbner fan is called Gfan, based on an article of Fukuda, et al. which is included in some computer algebra systems such as Singular, Macaulay2, and CoCoA.
