= Wang Dongming (academic) =

Wang Dongming (Chinese: 王东明; born July 1961 in Anhui, China) is Research Director (Directeur de Recherche) at the French National Center for Scientific Research (Centre National de la Recherche Scientifique, CNRS). He was awarded Wen-tsün Wu Chair Professor at the University of Science and Technology of China in 2001, Changjiang Scholar of the Chinese Ministry of Education in 2005, and Bagui Scholar of Guangxi Zhuang Autonomous Region, China in 2014. He was elected Member of the Academia Europaea in 2017.

Wang worked on algorithmic elimination theory, geometric reasoning and knowledge management, and applications of symbolic computation to qualitative analysis of differential equations. In 1993 he proposed an elimination method for triangular decomposition of polynomial systems, which has been referred to as Wang's method and compared with other three methods. Later on he introduced the concepts of regular systems and simple systems and devised algorithms for regular and simple triangular decompositions. He also developed a package, called Epsilon, which implements his methods.

Wang popularized the use of methods and tools of computer algebra for symbolic analysis of stability and bifurcation of differential and biological systems. He constructed a class of cubic differential systems with six small-amplitude limit cycles and rediscovered the incompleteness of Kukles' center conditions of 1944, which stimulated the study of Kukles' system in hundred papers. Since 2004 he has been involved in research projects on geometric knowledge management and discovery. With co-workers he developed an algorithmic approach for automated discovery of geometric theorems from images of diagrams.

Wang served as General Chair of ISSAC 2007 and is founding Editor-in-Chief and Managing Editor of Mathematics in Computer Science and Executive Associate Editor-in-Chief of SCIENCE CHINA Information Sciences.

Currently he works as Professor at Beihang University and Guangxi University for Nationalities, China on leave (détaché) from CNRS.
