= Axiom (computer algebra system) =

Computer algebra system

- Developer: Independent group of people
- Stable release: 20210105dp1 / May 3, 2025; 18 months ago
- Written in: Lisp
- Operating system: Cross-platform
- Type: Computer algebra system
- License: Modified BSD License
- Website: www.nongnu.org/axiom
- Repository: https://git.sv.gnu.org/cgit/axiom.git

Axiom is a free, general-purpose computer algebra system. It consists of an interpreter environment, a compiler and a library, which defines a strongly typed hierarchy.

== History ==
Two computer algebra systems named Scratchpad were developed by IBM. The first one was started in 1965 by James Griesmer at the request of Ralph Gomory, and written in Fortran. The development of this software was stopped before any public release. The second Scratchpad, originally named Scratchpad II, was developed from 1977 on, at Thomas J. Watson Research Center, under the direction of Richard Dimick Jenks.

The design is principally due to Richard D. Jenks (IBM Research), James H. Davenport (University of Bath), Barry M. Trager (IBM Research), David Y.Y. Yun (Southern Methodist University) and Victor S. Miller (IBM Research). Early consultants on the project were David Barton (University of California, Berkeley) and James W. Thatcher (IBM Research). Implementation included Robert Sutor (IBM Research), Scott C. Morrison (University of California, Berkeley), Christine J. Sundaresan (IBM Research), Timothy Daly (IBM Research), Patrizia Gianni (University of Pisa), Albrecht Fortenbacher (Universitaet Karlsruhe), Stephen M. Watt (IBM Research and University of Waterloo), Josh Cohen (Yale University), Michael Rothstein (Kent State University), Manuel Bronstein (IBM Research), Michael Monagan (Simon Fraser University), Jonathan Steinbach (IBM Research), William Burge (IBM Research), Jim Wen (IBM Research), William Sit (City College of New York), and Clifton Williamson (IBM Research)

Scratchpad II was renamed Axiom when IBM decided, circa 1990, to make it a commercial product. A few years later, it was sold to NAG. In 2001, it was withdrawn from the market and re-released under the Modified BSD License. Since then, the project's lead developer has been Tim Daly.

In 2007, Axiom was forked twice, originating two different open-source projects: OpenAxiom and FriCAS, following "serious disagreement about project goals". The Axiom project continued to be developed by Tim Daly.

The current research direction is "Proving Axiom Sane", that is, logical, rational, judicious, and sound.

== Documentation ==
Axiom is a literate program. The source code is becoming available in a set of volumes which are available on the www.nongnu.org/axiom website. These volumes contain the actual source code of the system.

The currently available documents are:

- Combined Table of Contents
- Volume 0: Axiom Jenks and Sutor—The main textbook
- Volume 1: Axiom Tutorial—A simple introduction
- Volume 2: Axiom Users Guide—Detailed examples of domain use (incomplete)
- Volume 3: Axiom Programmers Guide—Guided examples of program writing (incomplete)
- Volume 4: Axiom Developers Guide—Short essays on developer-specific topics (incomplete)
- Volume 5: Axiom Interpreter—Source code for Axiom interpreter (incomplete)
- Volume 6: Axiom Command—Source code for system commands and scripts (incomplete)
- Volume 7: Axiom Hyperdoc—Source code and explanation of X11 Hyperdoc help browser
  - Volume 7.1 Axiom Hyperdoc Pages—Source code for Hyperdoc pages
- Volume 8: Axiom Graphics—Source code for X11 Graphics subsystem
  - Volume 8.1 Axiom Gallery—A Gallery of Axiom images
- Volume 9: Axiom Compiler—Source code for Spad compiler (incomplete)
- Volume 10: Axiom Algebra Implementation—Essays on implementation issues (incomplete)
  - Volume 10.1: Axiom Algebra Theory—Essays containing background theory
  - Volume 10.2: Axiom Algebra Categories—Source code for Axiom categories
  - Volume 10.3: Axiom Algebra Domains—Source code for Axiom domains
  - Volume 10.4: Axiom Algebra Packages—Source code for Axiom packages
  - Volume 10.5: Axiom Algebra Numerics—Source code for Axiom numerics
- Volume 11: Axiom Browser—Source pages for Axiom Firefox browser front end
- Volume 12: Axiom Crystal—Source code for Axiom Crystal front end (incomplete)
- Volume 13: Proving Axiom Correct—Prove Axiom Algebra (incomplete)
- Volume 15: The Axiom SANE Compiler
- Bibliography: Axiom Bibliography—Literature references
- Bug List: Axiom Bug List-Bug List
- Reference Card: Axiom Reference Card—Useful function summary

== Videos ==
The Axiom project has a major focus on providing documentation. The project has a series of instructional videos, which are also available on the www.nongnu.org/axiom website. The first video provides details on the Axiom information sources.

== Philosophy ==
The Axiom project focuses on the "30 Year Horizon". The primary philosophy is that Axiom needs to develop several fundamental features in order to be useful to the next generation of computational mathematicians. Knuth's literate programming technique is used throughout the source code. Axiom plans to use proof technology to prove the correctness of the algorithms (such as Rocq and ACL2).

Binary AXIOM packages are available for installation on a wide variety of platforms, such as Debian Linux.

== Design ==
In Axiom, each object has a type. Examples of types are mathematical structures (such as rings, fields, polynomials) as well as data structures from computer science (e.g., lists, trees, hash tables).

A function can take a type as argument, and its return value can also be a type. For example, Fraction is a function, that takes an IntegralDomain as argument, and returns the field of fractions of its argument. As another example, the ring of $4\times 4$ matrices with rational entries would be constructed as SquareMatrix(4, Fraction Integer). Of course, when working in this domain, 1 is interpreted as the identity matrix and A^-1 would give the inverse of the matrix A, if it exists.

Several operations can have the same name, and the types of both the arguments and the result are used to determine which operation is applied (cf. function overloading).

Axiom comes with an extension language called SPAD. All the mathematical knowledge of Axiom is written in this language. The interpreter accepts roughly the same language.

== Features ==
Within the interpreter environment, Axiom uses type inference and a heuristic algorithm to make explicit type annotations mostly unnecessary.

It features 'HyperDoc', an interactive browser-like help system, and can display two and three dimensional graphics, also providing interactive features like rotation and lighting. It also has a specialized interaction mode for Emacs, as well as a plugin for the TeXmacs editor.

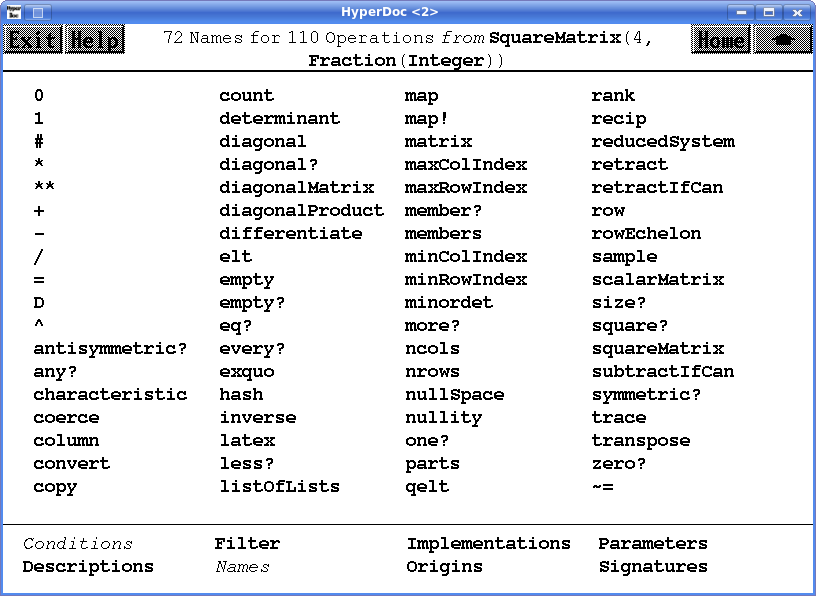
HyperDoc displaying the available operations for a domain

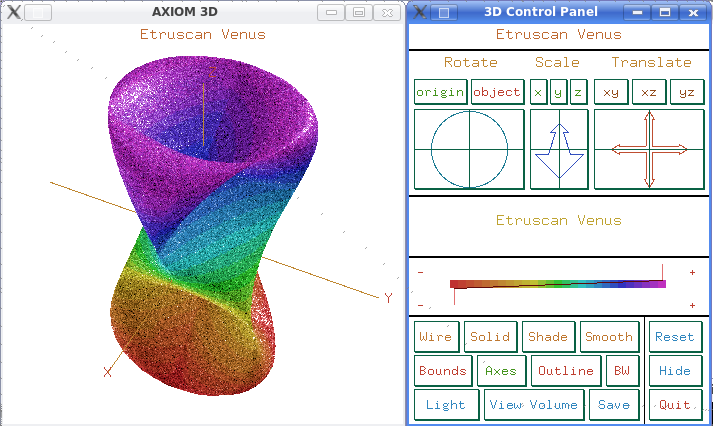
Axiom displaying a surface

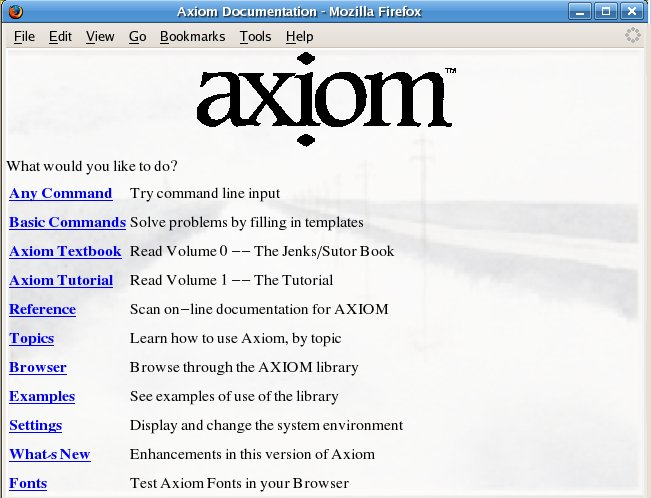
Axiom Firefox Browser Interface

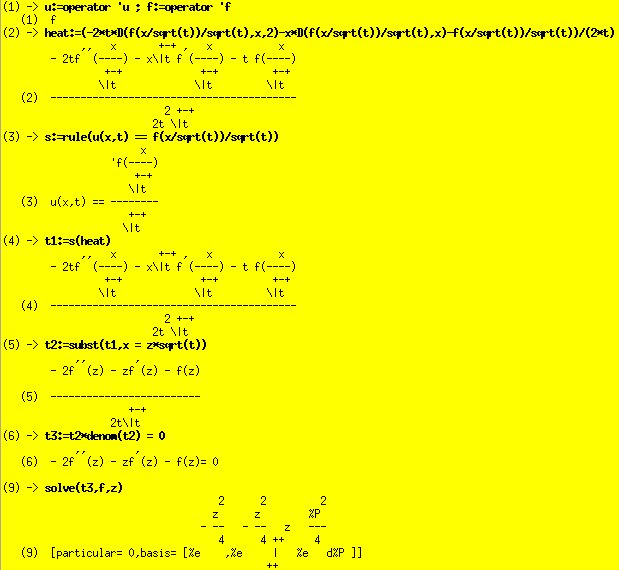
Axiom simplifying a heat equation

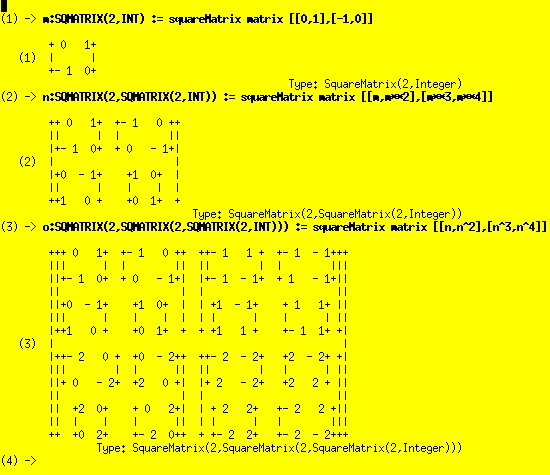
Axiom matrix manipulation

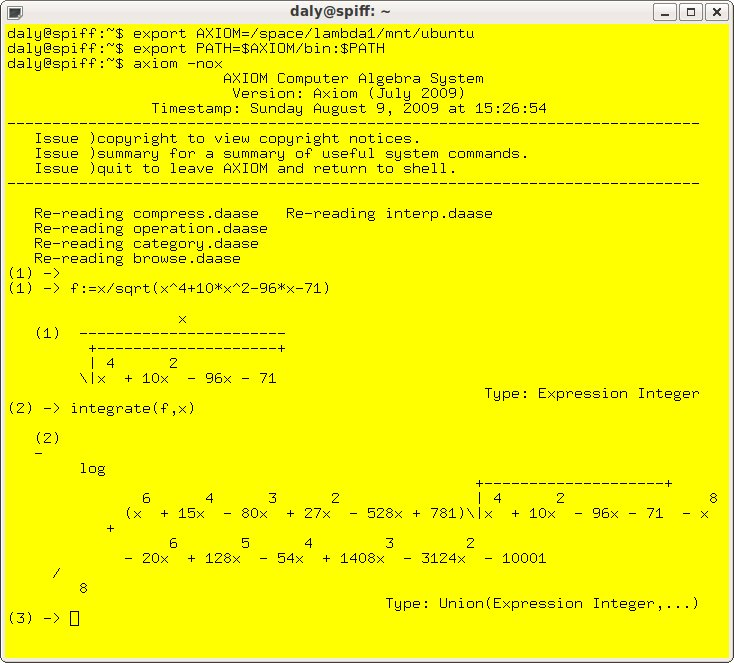
Axiom computing a Risch integral

Axiom has an implementation of the Risch algorithm for elementary integration, which was done by Manuel Bronstein and Barry Trager. While this implementation can find most elementary antiderivatives and whether they exist, it does have some non-implemented branches, and raises an error when such cases are encountered during integration.

== See also ==
- A# programming language
- Aldor programming language
- List of computer algebra systems
