= Hybrid computing =

Hybrid computing may refer to:

- Analog-digital hybrid computation (see Hybrid computer)
- Symbolic-numeric computation
- A term for heterogeneous computing
