= Computer mathematics =

Computer mathematics may refer to:

- Automated theorem proving, the proving of mathematical theorems by a computer program
- Symbolic computation, the study and development of algorithms and software for manipulating mathematical expressions and other mathematical objects
- Computational science, constructing numerical solutions and using computers to analyze and solve scientific and engineering problems
- Theoretical computer science, collection of topics of computer science and mathematics that focuses on the more abstract and mathematical aspects of computing
