= Faugère's F4 and F5 algorithms =

Algorithms for computing Gröbner bases

In computer algebra, the Faugère F4 algorithm, by Jean-Charles Faugère, computes the Gröbner basis of an ideal of a multivariate polynomial ring. The algorithm uses the same mathematical principles as the Buchberger algorithm, but computes many normal forms in one go by forming a generally sparse matrix and using fast linear algebra to do the reductions in parallel.

The Faugère F5 algorithm first calculates the Gröbner basis of a pair of generator polynomials of the ideal. Then it uses this basis to reduce the size of the initial matrices of generators for the next larger basis:

If G_{prev} is an already computed Gröbner basis (f_{2}, …, f_{m}) and we want to compute a Gröbner basis of (f_{1}) + G_{prev} then we will construct matrices whose rows are m f_{1} such that m is a monomial not divisible by the leading term of an element of G_{prev}.

This strategy allows the algorithm to apply two new criteria based on what Faugère calls signatures of polynomials. Thanks to these criteria, the algorithm can compute Gröbner bases for a large class of interesting polynomial systems, called regular sequences, without ever simplifying a single polynomial to zero—the most time-consuming operation in algorithms that compute Gröbner bases. It is also very effective for a large number of non-regular sequences.

== Implementations ==
The Faugère F4 algorithm is implemented

- in FGb, Faugère's own implementation, which includes interfaces for using it from C/C++ or Maple,
- in Maple computer algebra system, as the option method=fgb of function Groebner[gbasis]
- in the Magma computer algebra system,
- in the SageMath computer algebra system,

Study versions of the Faugère F5 algorithm is implemented in

- the SINGULAR computer algebra system;
- the SageMath computer algebra system.
- in SymPy Python package.

== Applications ==
The previously intractable "cyclic 10" problem was solved by F5, as were a number of systems related to cryptography; for example HFE and C^{*}.
