= A-sharp =

A-sharp or A♯ may refer to:

- A♯ (musical note)
- A-sharp major, enharmonic key to B-flat major
- A-sharp minor
- A Sharp (.NET), a port of the Ada programming language to the .NET environment
- A Sharp (Axiom), a programming language for the Axiom computer algebra system

== See also ==
- "A♯1 Roller Rager", 2009 song by CKY
