= Polyhedral complex =

Math concept

In mathematics, a polyhedral complex is a set of polyhedra in a real vector space that fit together in a specific way. Polyhedral complexes generalize simplicial complexes and arise in various areas of polyhedral geometry, such as tropical geometry, splines and hyperplane arrangements.

== Definition ==
A polyhedral complex $\mathcal{K}$ is a set of polyhedra that satisfies the following conditions:

1. Every face of a polyhedron from $\mathcal{K}$ is also in $\mathcal{K}$.
2. The intersection of any two polyhedra $\sigma_1, \sigma_2 \in \mathcal{K}$ is a face of both $\sigma_1$ and $\sigma_2$.

Note that the empty set is a face of every polyhedron, and so the intersection of two polyhedra in $\mathcal{K}$ may be empty.

== Examples ==
- Tropical varieties are polyhedral complexes satisfying a certain balancing condition.
- Simplicial complexes are polyhedral complexes in which every polyhedron is a simplex.
- Voronoi diagrams.
- Splines.

== Fans ==
A (polyhedral) fan is a polyhedral complex in which every polyhedron is a cone from the origin. Examples of fans include:

- The normal fan of a polytope.
- The fan associated to a toric variety (see Toric variety § Fundamental theorem for toric geometry).
- The Gröbner fan of an ideal of a polynomial ring.
- A tropical variety obtained by tropicalizing an algebraic variety over a valued field with trivial valuation.
- The recession fan of a tropical variety.
