= A Sharp (Axiom) =

Programming language

A^{♯}
- Paradigm: Multi-paradigm: object-oriented, functional
- Designed by: Richard Dimick Jenks, Barry Trager, Stephen M. Watt, James Davenport, Robert Sutor, Scott Morrison
- Developer: Thomas J. Watson Research Center
- First appeared: 1971; 55 years ago
- Stable release: Gold / November 2008; 17 years ago
- Preview release: Silver / July 31, 2014; 12 years ago
- Platform: Cross-platform (16-32-64-bit): RS/6000, SPARC, Alpha, IA-32, Intel 286, Motorola 680x0, System/370
- OS: Cross-platform: Linux, AIX, SunOS, HP-UX, NeXT, Mach, OS/2, DOS, Windows, VMS, VM/CMS
- License: BSD-like
- Filename extensions: .as
- Website: axiom-developer.org

Influenced by
- Pascal, Haskell

Influenced
- Aldor

A^{♯} (pronounced: A sharp) is an object-oriented functional programming language distributed as a separable component of Version 2 of the Axiom computer algebra system. A# types and functions are first-class values and can be used freely together with an extensive library of data structures and other mathematical abstractions. A key design guideline for A# was suitability of compiling to portable and efficient machine code. It is distributed as free and open-source software under a BSD-like license.

Development of A# has now changed to the programming language Aldor.

A# has both an optimising compiler, and an intermediate code interpreter. The compiler can emit any of:

- Executable stand-alone programs
- Libraries, of native operating system format objects, or of portable bytecode
- Source code, for languages C, or Lisp

The following C compilers are supported: GNU Compiler Collection (GCC), Xlc, Oracle Developer Studio, Borland, Metaware, and MIPS C.
