= Normal fan =

Structure in convex geometry

In mathematics, specifically convex geometry, the normal fan of a convex polytope P is a polyhedral fan that is dual to P. Normal fans have applications to polyhedral combinatorics, linear programming, tropical geometry, toric geometry and other areas of mathematics.

== Definition ==
Given a convex polytope P in R^{n}, the normal fan N_{P} of P is a polyhedral fan in the dual space, (R^{n})* whose cones consist of the normal cone C_{F} to each face F of P,

$$N_P = \{C_F\}_{F \in \operatorname{face}(P)}.$$

Each normal cone C_{F} is defined as the set of linear functionals w such that the set of points x in P that maximize w(x) contains F,

$$C_F = \{w \in (\mathbb{R}^n)^* \mid F \subseteq \operatorname{argmax}_{x \in P} w(x) \}.$$

== Properties ==
- N_{P} is a complete fan, meaning the union of its cones is the whole space, (R^{n})*.
- If F is a face of P of dimension d, then its normal cone C_{F} has dimension n – d. The normal cones to vertices of P are full dimensional. If P has full dimension, the normal cones to the facets of P are the rays of N_{P} and the normal cone to P itself is C_{P} = {0}, the zero cone.
- The affine span of face F of P is orthogonal to the linear span of its normal cone, C_{F}.
- The correspondence between faces of P and cones of N_{P} reverses inclusion, meaning that for faces F and G of P,

$$F \subseteq G \quad \Leftrightarrow \quad C_F \supseteq C_G.$$

- Since N_{P} is a fan, the intersection of any two of its cones is also a cone in N_{P}. For faces F and G of P,

$$C_F \cap C_G = C_H$$

where H is the smallest face of P that contains both F and G.

== Applications ==
- If polytope P is thought of as the feasible region of a linear program, the normal fan of P partitions the space of objective functions based on the solution set to the linear program defined by each. The linear program in which the goal is to maximize linear objective function w has solution set F if and only if w is in the relative interior of the cone C_{F}.
- If polytope P has the origin in its interior, then the normal fan of P can be constructed from the polar dual of P by taking the cone over each face of the dual polytope, P°.
- For f a polynomial in n variables with coefficients in C, the tropical hypersurface of f is supported on a subfan of the normal fan of the Newton polytope P of f. In particular, the tropical hypersurface is supported on the cones in N_{P} of dimension less than n.
