= Patrizia Gianni =

Italian mathematician (born 1952)

Patrizia M. Gianni (born 1952) is an Italian mathematician specializing in computer algebra. She is known for her early research on Gröbner bases including her discovery of the FGLM algorithm for changing monomial orderings in Gröbner bases, and for her development of the components of the Axiom computer algebra system concerning polynomials and rational functions.

Gianni is a professor of algebra in the mathematics department of the University of Pisa. She earned a laurea from the University of Pisa, and has worked for IBM Research as well as for the University of Pisa.
