= George Bergman =

American mathematician (born 1943)

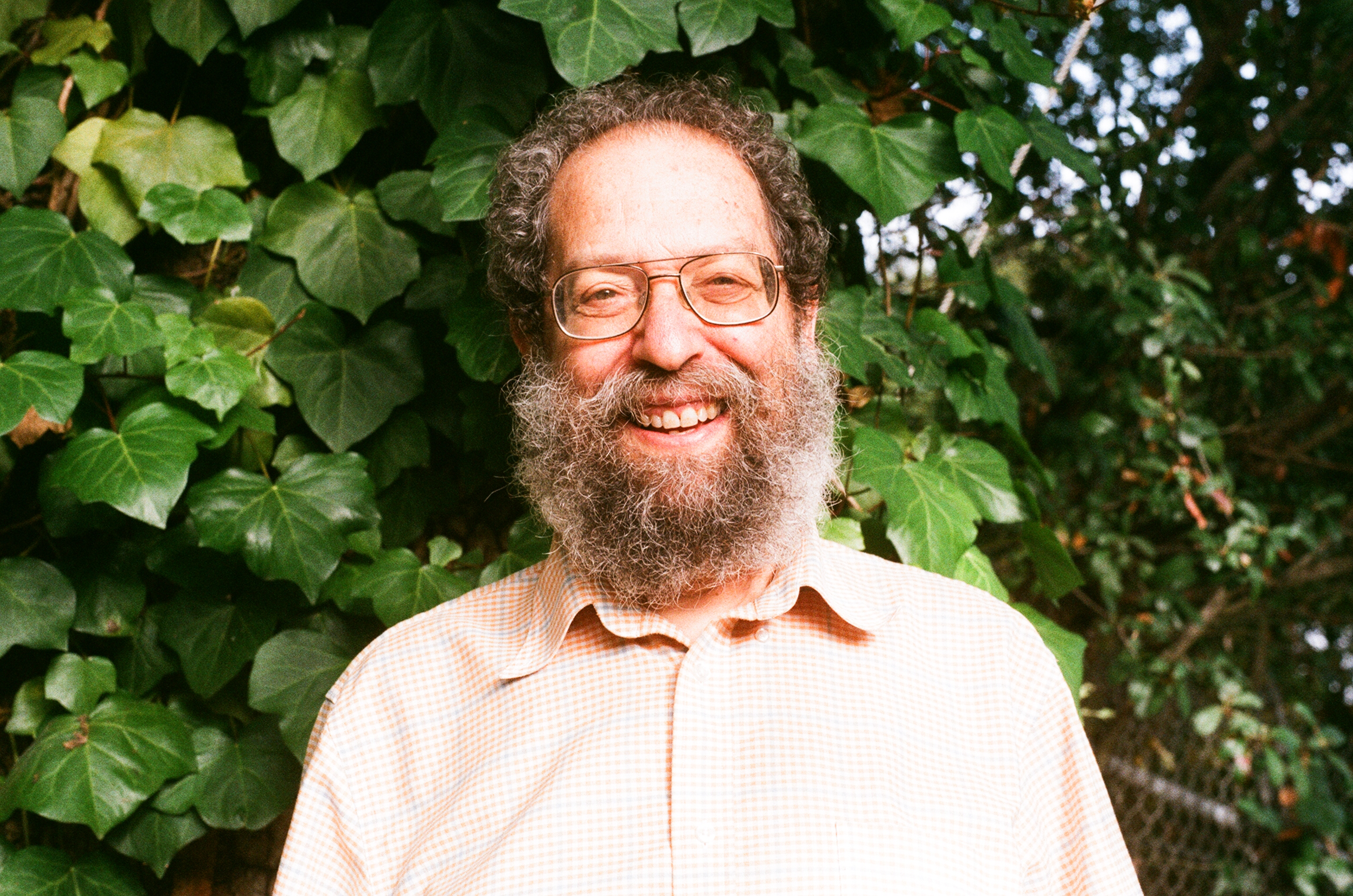
- Bergman in 2011
- Born: July 22, 1943 (age 83); Brooklyn, New York, United States
- Education: Harvard University (PhD)
- Known for: Bergman's diamond lemma
- Scientific career
- Fields: Mathematics
- Workplaces: University of California, Berkeley
- Doctoral advisor: John Tate Jr

George Mark Bergman (born 22 July 1943) is an American mathematician. He attended Stuyvesant High School in New York City and received his PhD from Harvard University in 1968, under the direction of John Tate. The year before he had been appointed assistant professor of mathematics at the University of California, Berkeley, where he has taught ever since, being promoted to associate professor in 1974 and to professor in 1978.

His primary research area is algebra, in particular associative rings, universal algebra, category theory and the construction of counterexamples. Mathematical logic is an additional research area. Bergman officially retired in 2009, but is still teaching. His interests beyond mathematics include subjects as diverse as third-party politics and the works of James Joyce.

He was designated a member of the inaugural class of fellows of the American Mathematical Society in 2013.

== Selected bibliography ==
- An Invitation to General Algebra and Universal Constructions, Universitext, Springer, 2015, doi:10.1007/978-3-319-11478-1, ISBN 978-3-319-11477-4 (updated 2016)
- Bergman, George M. (2011), "Homomorphic images of pro-nilpotent algebras", Illinois Journal of Mathematics, 55 (3): 719–748, arXiv:0912.0020, doi:10.1215/ijm/1369841782
- Bergman, George M. (2006), "Generating infinite symmetric groups", Bulletin of the London Mathematical Society, 38 (3): 429–440, arXiv:math/0401304, doi:10.1112/S0024609305018308, S2CID 1892679
- (with Adam O. Hausknecht) Co-groups and co-rings in categories of associative rings, Mathematical Surveys and Monographs, vol. 45, American Mathematical Society Providence, RI, 1996, ISBN 0-8218-0495-2
- Bergman, George M. (1983), "Embedding rings in completed graded rings 4. Commutative algebras", Journal of Algebra, 84 (1): 62–106, doi:10.1016/0021-8693(83)90068-6
- Bergman, George M. (1978), "The diamond lemma for ring theory", Advances in Mathematics, 29 (2): 178–218, doi:10.1016/0001-8708(78)90010-5
- Bergman, George (1976), "Rational relations and rational identities in division rings. II", Journal of Algebra, 43 (1): 267–297, doi:10.1016/0021-8693(76)90160-5
- Bergman, George M. (1974), "Coproducts and some universal ring constructions", Transactions of the American Mathematical Society, 200: 33–88, doi:10.1090/S0002-9947-1974-0357503-7
