= Jean-Charles Faugère =

French mathematician and computer scientist

Jean-Charles Faugère is the head of the POLSYS project-team (Solvers for Algebraic Systems and Applications) of the Laboratoire d'Informatique de Paris 6 (LIP6) and Paris–Rocquencourt center of INRIA, in Paris. The team was formerly known as SPIRAL and SALSA.

Faugère obtained his Ph.D. in mathematics in 1994 at the University of Paris VI, with the dissertation "Résolution des systemes d’équations algébriques" (Solving systems of algebraic equations), under the supervision of Daniel Lazard.

He works on Gröbner bases and their applications, in particular, in cryptology. With his collaborators, he has devised the FGLM algorithm for computing Gröbner bases; he has also introduced the F4 and F5 algorithms for calculating Gröbner bases. In particular, his F5 algorithm allowed him to solve various problems in cryptography such as HFE; he also introduced a new type of cryptanalysis, called algebraic cryptanalysis.
