= International Symposium on Symbolic and Algebraic Computation =

- Abbreviation: ISSAC
- Discipline: Symbolic computation

Publication details
- Publisher: ACM
- History: 1988–
- Frequency: annual

The International Symposium on Symbolic and Algebraic Computation (ISSAC) is an academic conference in the field of computer algebra. ISSAC has been organized annually since 1988, typically in July. The conference is regularly sponsored by the Association for Computing Machinery special interest group SIGSAM, and the proceedings since 1989 have been published by ACM. ISSAC is considered as being one of the most influential conferences for the publication of scientific computing research.

== History ==
The first ISSAC took place in Rome on 4–8 July 1988. It succeeded a series of meetings held between 1966 and 1987 under the names SYMSAM, SYMSAC, EUROCAL, EUROSAM and EUROCAM.

== ISSAC Awards ==
- The Richard D. Jenks Memorial Prize for excellence in software engineering applied to computer algebra is awarded at ISSAC every other year since 2004.
- The ISSAC Distinguished Paper Award is awarded at ISSAC since 2002 to authors that display excellence in areas that include, but are not limited to, algebraic computation, symbolic-numeric computation, and system design and implementation.
- The ISSAC Distinguished Student Author Award is awarded at ISSAC since 2004 to authors if they were a student at the time their paper was submitted.

== Conference topics ==
Typical topics include:

- exact linear algebra;
- polynomial system solving;
- symbolic summation;
- symbolic integration and computational differential algebra;
- computational group theory;
- symbolic-numeric algorithms;
- the design and implementation of computer algebra systems;
- applications of computer algebra.

== See also ==
- Journal of Symbolic Computation
