= Journal of Symbolic Computation =

- Discipline: Computer science
- Language: English
- Edited by: Josef Schicho, Cordian Riener

Publication details
- History: 1985-present
- Publisher: Elsevier
- Frequency: Monthly
- Impact factor: 0.847 (2020)

Standard abbreviations
- ISO 4: J. Symb. Comput.
- MathSciNet: J. Symbolic Comput.

Indexing
- ISSN: 0747-7171
- LCCN: 85644369
- OCLC no.: 10791050

Links
- Journal homepage; Online access

The Journal of Symbolic Computation is a peer-reviewed monthly scientific journal covering all aspects of symbolic computation published by Academic Press and then by Elsevier. It is targeted to both mathematicians and computer scientists. It was established in 1985 by Bruno Buchberger, who served as its editor until 1994.

The journal covers a wide variety of topics, including:

- Computer algebra, for which it is considered the top journal
- Computational geometry
- Automated theorem proving
- Applications of symbolic computation in education, science, and industry

According to the Journal Citation Reports, its 2020 impact factor is 0.847. The journal is abstracted and indexed by Scopus and the Science Citation Index.

== See also ==
- Higher-Order and Symbolic Computation
- International Symposium on Symbolic and Algebraic Computation
