= Symbolic-numeric computation =

In mathematics and computer science, symbolic-numeric computation is the use of software that combines symbolic and numeric methods to solve problems.
