= Bruno Buchberger =

Austrian mathematician (born 1942)

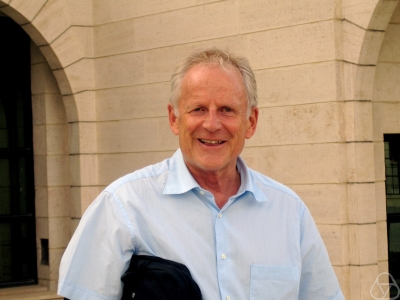
- Born: 22 October 1942 (age 83); Innsbruck
- Education: University of Innsbruck
- Known for: Gröbner bases Buchberger's algorithm
- Awards: Paris Kanellakis Theory and Practice Award; Austrian Golden Medal of Honour
- Scientific career
- Fields: Computer mathematics
- Workplaces: Johannes Kepler University; Softwarepark Hagenberg
- Thesis: An Algorithm for Finding the Basis Elements of the Residue Class Ring Modulo a Zero-dimensional Polynomial Ideal (1966)
- Doctoral advisor: Wolfgang Gröbner

Bruno Buchberger (born 22 October 1942) is Professor of Computer Mathematics at Johannes Kepler University in Linz, Austria. In his 1965 Ph.D. thesis, he created the theory of Gröbner bases, and has developed this theory throughout his career. He named these objects after his advisor Wolfgang Gröbner. Since 1995, he has been active in the Theorema project at the University of Linz.

== Career ==
In 1987, Buchberger founded and chaired the Research Institute for Symbolic Computation (RISC) at Johannes Kepler University. In 1985, he started the Journal of Symbolic Computation, which has now become the premier publication in the field of computer algebra.

Buchberger also conceived Softwarepark Hagenberg in 1989 and, since then, has been directing the expansion of this Austrian technology park for software.

In 2014 he became a member of the Global Digital Mathematical Library Working Group of the International Mathematical Union.

Beyond the applications of Gröbner bases in computational algebra, Buchberger has also applied them to problems of automated theorem proving in systems theory, computational geometry, and the mathematics of origami.

== Awards ==
- Wilhelm Exner Medal (1995).
- Paris Kanellakis Theory and Practice Award (2007). For theory of Gröbner bases.
- Golden Medal of Honor by the Upper Austrian Government
- Honorary doctorates from the Universities of Nijmegen (1993), Timișoara (2000), Bath (2005), Waterloo (2011), and Innsbruck (2012).
- Herbrand Award for Distinguished Contributions to Automated Reasoning (2018)

== See also ==
- Buchberger's algorithm
- Gröbner bases

== Sources ==
- Hong, Hoon; Kapur, Deepak; Paule, Peter; Winkler, Franz; Faculty Of Risc-Linz (2006). "Bruno Buchberger — A life devoted to symbolic computation". Journal of Symbolic Computation. 41 (3–4): 255–258. doi:10.1016/j.jsc.2005.09.005.
