= SIGSAM =

SIGSAM is the ACM Special Interest Group on Symbolic and Algebraic Manipulation. It publishes the ACM Communications in Computer Algebra and often sponsors the International Symposium on Symbolic and Algebraic Computation (ISSAC).
