= Stephen M. Watt =

Canadian computer scientist and mathematician

Stephen M. Watt, a computer scientist and mathematician, is past Dean of the Faculty of Mathematics and Professor in the David R. Cheriton School of Computer Science at the University of Waterloo, Ontario, Canada.

He previously held the title of Distinguished University Professor at Western University, Ontario, where he served for periods as Chair of the Department of Computer Science and Director of the Ontario Research Centre for Computer Algebra. Prior to this, he held positions at the IBM T.J. Watson Research Center in Yorktown Heights (USA) and INRIA and the University of Nice (France).

Professor Watt's areas of research include algorithms and systems for computer algebra, programming languages and compilers, mathematical handwriting recognition and document analysis. He was one of the original authors of the Maple and Axiom computer algebra systems, and the principal architect of the Aldor programming language and its compiler at IBM Research. He is co-author of the MathML and editor of the InkML W3C standards.

Watt was a co-founder of Maplesoft in 1988 and served on its board of directors from 1998 to 2009. He has additionally served on the board of directors of the Descartes Systems Group, including two periods as board chair, and on the boards of Waste Diversion Ontario, the McMichael Canadian Art Foundation, the Numerical Algorithms Group, and various other organizations.

Professor Watt was made Doctor Honoris Causa of the University of the West (Romania) in 2011 and was awarded the J.W. Graham Medal in Computing and Innovation in 2012.
