= Aldor =

Programming language which first appeared in 1990

- Paradigm: Multi-paradigm: object-oriented, functional, imperative, dependent typed, logic
- Designed by: Richard Dimick Jenks, Barry Trager, Stephen Watt, James Davenport, Robert Sutor, Scott Morrison
- Developer: Thomas J. Watson Research Center
- First appeared: 1990; 36 years ago
- Stable release: 1.0.3
- Preview release: 1.1.0
- Platform: Axiom computer algebra system
- OS: Linux, Solaris, Windows
- License: Aldor Public 2.0, Apache 2.0
- Filename extensions: .al, .as
- Website: aldor.org

Major implementations
- Axiom computer algebra system

Influenced by
- A#, Pascal, Haskell

Aldor is a programming language. It is the successor of A# as the extension language of the Axiom computer algebra system.

Aldor combines imperative, functional, and object-oriented features. It has an elaborate type system, allowing types to be used as first-class values. Aldor's syntax is heavily influenced by Pascal, but it is optionally indentation-sensitive, using whitespace characters and the off-side rule, like Python. In its current implementation, it is compiled, but an interactive listener is provided.

Aldor is distributed as free and open-source software, under the Apache License 2.0.

== Examples ==
The Hello world program looks like this:

#include "aldor"
#include "aldorio"

stdout << "Hello, world!" << newline;

Example of dependent types (from the User Guide):

#include "aldor"
#include "aldorio"
#pile

sumlist(R: ArithmeticType, l: List R): R == 
    s: R := 0;
    for x in l repeat s := s + x
    s

import from List Integer, Integer, List SingleFloat, SingleFloat
stdout << sumlist(Integer, [2,3,4,5]) << newline
stdout << sumlist(SingleFloat, [2.0, 2.1, 2.2, 2.4]) << newline

99 Bottles of Beer:

#include "aldor"
#include "aldorio"

import from Integer, String;

bob(n: Integer): String == {
    b: String := " bottle";

    if n ~= 1 then b := b + "s";
    b + " of beer";
}

main(): () == {
    n: Integer := 99;
    otw: String := " on the wall";

    -- refrain
    while n > 0 repeat {
        stdout << n << bob(n) << otw << ", " << n << bob(n) << "." << newline;
        stdout << "Take one down and pass it around, ";
        n := n - 1;
        if n > 0 then stdout << n;
        else stdout << "no more";
        stdout << bob(n) << otw << "." << newline;
        stdout << newline;
    }

    -- last verse
    stdout << "No more" << bob(n) << otw << ", no more" << bob(n) << "." << newline;
    stdout << "Go to the store and buy some more, ";
    n: Integer := 99;
    stdout << n << bob(n) << otw << "." << newline;
}

main();
