= James W. Thatcher =

American computer scientist (1936–2019)

- Born: March 25, 1936; Schenectady, New York
- Died: December 7, 2019 (aged 83); Austin, Texas
- Education: University of Michigan
- Occupation: Computer scientist
- Spouse: Diana Seidel

James Winthrop Thatcher (March 25, 1936 – December 7, 2019) was an American computer scientist, and the inventor of the first screen reader, a type of assistive technology that enables the use of a computer by people with visual impairments.

Thatcher was also important to the development of the accessibility consulting industry.

Among many other awards, Thatcher was awarded the first ACM SIG Access Award for Outstanding Contributions to Computing and Accessibility for his contributions to digital accessibility in 2008.

== Early life ==
James Winthrop Thatcher was born on March 25, 1936 in Schenectady, New York to Dr. Everett Whiting Thatcher (1904-1992) and Tennie Marie Klotz (1905-1988). His father graduated from the University of Michigan in 1931 with a PhD in Physics, after which he spent 15 years as a Professor of Physics at Union College. During World War II, Everett taught electronic engineering to aspiring naval engineers. After the war, the family moved to San Diego, California, where James attended high school. He graduated from Pomona College in 1958 with a degree in Mathematics.

== Career ==
Thatcher earned one of the first PhDs in Computer Science in 1963 from the University of Michigan. His thesis advisor, Dr. Jesse Wright, was blind, and together they joined the Mathematical Sciences Department of IBM Research, to work on practical computing and the development of an audio-based computer access system for the IBM Personal Computer. The result of this work was one of the first screen readers for DOS, originally called PC-SAID, or Personal Computer Synthetic Audio Interface Driver. This was renamed and released in 1984 as IBM Screen Reader, which became the proprietary eponym for that general class of assistive technology. Thatcher went on to lead the development of IBM Screen Reader/2, the first screen reader for a graphical user interface.

In 1996, Thatcher joined the IBM Accessibility Center in Austin, Texas, where he helped establish the internal IBM Accessibility Guidelines for software development. These guidelines helped inform the later development of the W3C standard WCAG (Web Content Accessibility Guidelines).

Thatcher retired from IBM in 2000, to become an independent accessibility consultant. He retired from accessibility consulting in 2016.

== Awards ==
- Distinguished Service Award (1994), from the National Federation of the Blind for the development of the GUI screen reader
- Vice President's Hammer Award (1999), for work on the development of software accessibility standards with the U.S. Department of Education
- ACM SIG Access Award (2008), for Outstanding Contributions to Computing and Accessibility for his contributions to digital accessibility
- Making A Difference Award (2009), from ACM Special Interest Group for Computers and Society, for his career in accessibility
