= Monomial order =

Order for the terms of a polynomial

In mathematics, a monomial order (sometimes called a term order or an admissible order) is a total order on the set of all (monic) monomials in a given polynomial ring, satisfying the property of respecting multiplication, i.e.,

- If $u \leq v$ and $w$ is any other monomial, then $uw \leq vw$.

Monomial orderings are most commonly used with Gröbner bases and multivariate division. In particular, the property of being a Gröbner basis is always relative to a specific monomial order.

== Definition, details and variations ==
Besides respecting multiplication, monomial orders are often required to be well-orders, since this ensures the multivariate division procedure will terminate. There are however practical applications also for multiplication-respecting order relations on the set of monomials that are not well-orders.

In the case of finitely many variables, well-ordering of a monomial order is equivalent to the conjunction of the following two conditions:

1. The order is a total order.
2. If u is any monomial then $1 \leq u$.

Since these conditions may be easier to verify for a monomial order defined through an explicit rule, than to directly prove it is a well-ordering, they are sometimes preferred in definitions of monomial order.

=== Leading monomials, terms, and coefficients ===
The choice of a total order on the monomials allows sorting the terms of a polynomial. The leading term of a polynomial is thus the term of the largest monomial (for the chosen monomial ordering).

Concretely, let R be any ring of polynomials. Then the set M of the (monic) monomials in R is a basis of R, considered as a vector space over the field of the coefficients. Thus, any nonzero polynomial p in R has a unique expression $p = \textstyle\sum_{u \in S} c_u u$ as a linear combination of monomials, where S is a finite subset of M and the c_{u} are all nonzero. When a monomial order has been chosen, the leading monomial is the largest u in S, the leading coefficient is the corresponding c_{u}, and the leading term is the corresponding c_{u}u. Head monomial/coefficient/term is sometimes used as a synonym of "leading". Some authors use "monomial" instead of "term" and "power product" instead of "monomial". In this article, a monomial is assumed to not include a coefficient.

The defining property of monomial orderings implies that the order of the terms is kept when multiplying a polynomial by a monomial. Also, the leading term of a product of polynomials is the product of the leading terms of the factors.

== Examples ==
On the set $\left\{ x^n \mid n \in \mathbb{N} \right\}$ of powers of any one variable x, the only monomial orders are the natural ordering 1 < x < x^{2} < x^{3} < ... and its converse, the latter of which is not a well-ordering. Therefore, the notion of monomial order becomes interesting only in the case of multiple variables.

The monomial order implies an order on the individual indeterminates. One can simplify the classification of monomial orders by assuming that the indeterminates are named x_{1}, x_{2}, x_{3}, ... in decreasing order for the monomial order considered, so that always x_{1} > x_{2} > x_{3} > .... (If there should be infinitely many indeterminates, this convention is incompatible with the condition of being a well ordering, and one would be forced to use the opposite ordering; however the case of polynomials in infinitely many variables is rarely considered.) In the example below we use x, y and z instead of x_{1}, x_{2} and x_{3}. With this convention there are still many examples of different monomial orders.

=== Lexicographic order ===
Lexicographic order (lex) first compares exponents of x_{1} in the monomials, and in case of equality compares exponents of x_{2}, and so forth. The name is derived from the similarity with the usual alphabetical order used in lexicography for dictionaries, if monomials are represented by the sequence of the exponents of the indeterminates. If the number of indeterminates is fixed (as it is usually the case), the lexicographical order is a well-order, although this is not the case for the lexicographical order applied to sequences of various lengths.

For monomials of degree at most two in two indeterminates $x_1, x_2$, the lexicographic order (with $x_1>x_2$) is

$$x_1^2 > x_1x_2 > x_1 > x_2^2 > x_2 > 1.$$

For Gröbner basis computations, the lexicographic ordering tends to be the most costly; thus it should be avoided, as far as possible, except for very simple computations.

=== Graded lexicographic order ===
Graded lexicographic order (grlex, or deglex for degree lexicographic order) first compares the total degree (sum of all exponents), and in case of a tie applies lexicographic order. This ordering is not only a well ordering, it also has the property that any monomial is preceded only by a finite number of other monomials; this is not the case for lexicographic order, where all (infinitely many) powers of y are less than x (that lexicographic order is nevertheless a well ordering is related to the impossibility of constructing an infinite decreasing chain of monomials).

For monomials of degree at most two in two indeterminates $x_1, x_2$, the graded lexicographic order (with $x_1>x_2$) is

$$x_1^2 > x_1x_2 > x_2^2 > x_1 > x_2 > 1.$$

Although very natural, this ordering is rarely used: the Gröbner basis for the graded reverse lexicographic order, which follows, is easier to compute and provides the same information on the input set of polynomials.

=== Graded reverse lexicographic order ===
Graded reverse lexicographic order (grevlex, or degrevlex for degree reverse lexicographic order) compares the total degree first, then uses a lexicographic order as tie-breaker, but it reverses the outcome of the lexicographic comparison so that lexicographically larger monomials of the same degree are considered to be degrevlex smaller. For the final order to exhibit the conventional ordering x_{1} > x_{2} > ... > x_{n} of the indeterminates, it is furthermore necessary that the tie-breaker lexicographic order before reversal considers the last indeterminate x_{n} to be the largest, which means it must start with that indeterminate. A concrete recipe for the graded reverse lexicographic order is thus to compare by the total degree first, then compare exponents of the last indeterminate x_{n} but reversing the outcome (so the monomial with smaller exponent is larger in the ordering), followed (as always only in case of a tie) by a similar comparison of x_{n−1}, and so forth ending with x_{1}.

The differences between graded lexicographic and graded reverse lexicographic orders are subtle, since they in fact coincide for 1 and 2 indeterminates. The first difference comes for degree 2 monomials in 3 indeterminates, which are graded lexicographic ordered as $x_1^2 > x_1 x_2 > x_1 x_3 > x_2^2 > x_2 x_3 > x_3^2$ but graded reverse lexicographic ordered as $x_1^2 > x_1 x_2 > x_2^2 > x_1 x_3 > x_2 x_3 > x_3^2$. The general trend is that the reverse order exhibits all variables among the small monomials of any given degree, whereas with the non-reverse order the intervals of smallest monomials of any given degree will only be formed from the smallest variables.

=== Elimination order ===
Block order or elimination order (lexdeg) may be defined for any number of blocks but, for sake of simplicity, we consider only the case of two blocks (however, if the number of blocks equals the number of variables, this order is simply the lexicographic order). For this ordering, the variables are divided in two blocks x_{1},..., x_{h} and y_{1},...,y_{k} and a monomial ordering is chosen for each block, usually the graded reverse lexicographical order. Two monomials are compared by comparing their x part, and in case of a tie, by comparing their y part. This ordering is important as it allows elimination, an operation which corresponds to projection in algebraic geometry.

=== Weight order ===
Weight order depends on a vector $(a_1,\ldots,a_n)\in\R_{\geq0}^n$ called the weight vector. It first compares the dot product of the exponent sequences of the monomials with this weight vector, and in case of a tie uses some other fixed monomial order. For instance, the graded orders above are weight orders for the "total degree" weight vector (1,1,...,1). If the a_{i} are rationally independent numbers (so in particular none of them are zero and all fractions $\tfrac{a_i}{a_j}$ are irrational) then a tie can never occur, and the weight vector itself specifies a monomial ordering. In the contrary case, one could use another weight vector to break ties, and so on; after using n linearly independent weight vectors, there cannot be any remaining ties. One can in fact define any monomial ordering by a sequence of weight vectors (Cox et al. pp. 72–73), for instance (1,0,0,...,0), (0,1,0,...,0), ... (0,0,...,1) for lex, or (1,1,1,...,1), (1,1,..., 1,0), ... (1,0,...,0) for grevlex.

For example, consider the monomials $xy^2z$, $z^2$, $x^3$, and $x^2z^2$; the monomial orders above would order these four monomials as follows:

- Lex: $x^3 > x^2z^2 > xy^2z > z^2$ (power of $x$ dominates).
- Grlex: $x^2z^2 > xy^2z > x^3 > z^2$ (total degree dominates; higher power of $x$ broke tie among the first two).
- Grevlex: $xy^2z > x^2z^2 > x^3 > z^2$ (total degree dominates; lower power of $z$ broke tie among the first two).
- A weight order with weight vector (1,2,4): $x^2z^2 > xy^2z > z^2 > x^3$ (the dot products 10>9>8>3 do not leave any ties to be broken here).

== Related notions ==
- An elimination order guarantees that a monomial involving any of a set of indeterminates will always be greater than a monomial not involving any of them.
- A product order is the easier example of an elimination order. It consists in combining monomial orders on disjoint sets of indeterminates into a monomial order on their union. It simply compares the exponents of the indeterminates in the first set using the first monomial order, then breaks ties using the other monomial ordering on the indeterminates of the second set. This method obviously generalizes to any disjoint union of sets of indeterminates; the lexicographic order can be so obtained from the singleton sets {x_{1}}, {x_{2}}, {x_{3}}, ... (with the unique monomial ordering for each singleton).

When using monomial orderings to compute Gröbner bases, different orders can lead to different results, and the difficulty of the computation may vary dramatically. For example, graded reverse lexicographic order has a reputation for producing, almost always, the Gröbner bases that are the easiest to compute (this is enforced by the fact that, under rather common conditions on the ideal, the polynomials in the Gröbner basis have a degree that is at most exponential in the number of variables; no such complexity result exists for any other ordering). On the other hand, elimination orders are required for elimination and relative problems.
