= Chases and Escapes =

Mathematics book on pursuit-evasion games

Chases and Escapes: The Mathematics of Pursuit and Evasion
- Author: Paul J. Nahin
- Language: English
- Subject: Continuous pursuit–evasion problems
- Publisher: Princeton University Press
- Publication date: 2007
- ISBN: 978-0-691-12514-5

Chases and Escapes: The Mathematics of Pursuit and Evasion is a mathematics book on continuous pursuit–evasion problems. It was written by Paul J. Nahin, and published by the Princeton University Press in 2007. It was reissued as a paperback reprint in 2012. The Basic Library List Committee of the Mathematical Association of America has rated this book as essential for inclusion in undergraduate mathematics libraries.

== Topics ==
The book has four chapters, covering the solutions to 21 continuous pursuit–evasion problems, with an additional 10 "challenge problems" left for readers to solve, with solutions given in an appendix. The problems are presented as entertaining stories that "breathe life into the mathematics and invite wider engagement", and their solutions use varied methods, including the computer calculation of numerical solutions for differential equations whose solutions have no closed form. Most of the material was previously known, but is collected here for the first time. The book also provides background material on the history of the problems it describes, although this is not its main focus.

Even before beginning its main content, the preface of the book begins with an example of pure evasion from known pursuit, the path used by the Enola Gay to escape the blast of the nuclear bomb it dropped on Hiroshima. The first chapter of the book concerns the opposite situation of "pure pursuit" without evasion, including the initial work in this area by Pierre Bouguer in 1732. Bouger studied a problem of pirates chasing a merchant ship, in which the merchant ship (unaware of the pirates) travels on a straight line while the pirate ship always travels towards the current position of the merchant ship. The resulting pursuit curve is called a radiodrome, and this chapter studies several similar problems and stories involving a linearly moving target, including variations where the pursuer may aim ahead of the target and the tractrix curve generated by a pursuer that follows the target at constant distance.

Chapter 2 considers targets moving to evade their pursuers, beginning with an example of circular evasive motion described in terms of a dog chasing a duck in a pond, with the dog beginning at the center and the duck moving circularly around the bank. Other variants considered in this chapter include cases where the target is hidden from view, and moving on an unknown trajectory. Chapter 3 considers "cyclic pursuit" problems in which multiple agents pursue each other, as in the mice problem.

The fourth and final chapter is entitled "Seven classic evasion problems". It begins with a problem from Martin Gardner's Mathematical Games, the reverse of the dog-and-duck problem, in which a person on a raft in a circular lake tries to reach the shore before a pursuer on land reaches the same point. It also includes hide-and-seek problems and their formulation using game theory, and the work of Richard Rado and Abram Samoilovitch Besicovitch on a man and lion of equal speed trapped in a circular arena, with the lion trying to catch the man, first popularized in A Mathematician's Miscellany by J. E. Littlewood.

== Audience and reception ==
The book assumes an undergraduate-level understanding of calculus and differential equations. It also uses some game theory but its coverage of the necessary material in this area is self-contained. It is not a textbook, but could be used to provide motivating examples for courses in calculus and differential equations, or as the basis of an undergraduate research project to a student who has completed this material. As well, the book may be of interest to any reader with the requisite background who enjoys mathematics.

Game theorist Gerald A. Heuer writes that "The treatment in general is very good, and readers are likely to appreciate the author's friendly and lively writing style." On the other hand, Mark Colyvan, a philosopher, would have preferred to see heavier coverage of the game-theoretic aspects of the subject, and notes that the mathematical idealizations used here can lead to inaccurate conclusions for real-world problems. Despite these quibbles, Colyvan writes that "this book provides an excellent vehicle to pursue the mathematics in question, and the mathematics in question is most certainly worth pursuing". Reviewer Bill Satzer calls the book "highly readable", and reviewer Justin Mullins writes that author Paul Nahin "guides us masterfully through the maths".
