= Howard Levi =

American mathematician (1916–2002)

- Born: November 9, 1916; New York City, U.S.
- Died: September 11, 2002 (aged 85); New York City, U.S.
- Education: Columbia University
- Known for: Levi's reduction process
- Scientific career
- Fields: Mathematics: differential algebra
- Workplaces: Columbia University; City University of New York
- Doctoral advisor: Joseph Fels Ritt

Howard Levi (November 9, 1916 – September 11, 2002) was an American mathematician who worked mainly in algebra and mathematical education. Levi was very active during the educational reforms in the United States, having proposed several new courses to replace the traditional ones.

== Biography ==
Levi was born in New York City in 1916. He earned a Ph.D. in mathematics from Columbia University in 1942 as a student of Joseph Fels Ritt. Soon after obtaining his degree, he became a researcher on the Manhattan Project.

At Wesleyan University he led a group that developed a course of geometry for high school students that treated Euclidean geometry as a special case of affine geometry. Much of the Wesleyan material was based on his book Foundations of Geometry and Trigonometry.

His book Polynomials, Power Series, and Calculus, written to be a textbook for a first course in calculus, presented an innovative approach, and received favorable reviews by Leonard Gillman, who wrote "[...] this book, with its wealth of imaginative ideas, deserves to be better known."

Levi's reduction process is named after him.

In his last years, he tried to find a proof of the four color theorem that did not rely on computers.

He died in New York City in 2002.

== Selected publications ==
=== Books ===
- Elements of Algebra (Chelsea Publishing Company, 1953, 1956, 1960, 1961)
- Elements of Geometry (Columbia University Press, 1956)
- Foundations of Geometry and Trigonometry (Prentice-Hall, 1956 and 1960)
- Fundamental Concepts of Mathematics (1957)
- Modern Coordinate Geometry: A Wesleyan Experimental Curricular Study (co-authored with C. Robert Clements, Harry Sitomer, et al., for the School Mathematics Study Group, 1961)
- Polynomials, Power Series, and Calculus (Van Nostrand, 1967, 1968)
- Topics in Geometry (1968, 1975)

=== Articles ===
- "On the values assumed by polynomials". Bull. Amer. Math. Soc. 45 (1939), no. 8, pp. 570–575. (LINK)
- "Composite polynomials with coefficients in an arbitrary field of characteristic zero". Amer. J. Math. 64 (1942), no. 1, pp. 389–400. (LINK)
- "On the structure of differential polynomials and on their theory of ideals". T. Am. Math. Soc. 51 (1942), pp. 532–568. (LINK)
- "A characterization of polynomial rings by means of order relations". Amer. J. Math. 65 (1943), no. 2, pp. 221–234. (LINK)
- "Exact nth derivatives". Bull. Amer. Math. Soc. 49 (1943), no. 8, pp. 631–636. (LINK)
- "The low power theorem for partial differential polynomials". Annals of Mathematics, Second Series, Vol. 46, no. 1 (1945), pp. 113–119. (LINK)
- "A geometric construction of the Dirichlet kernel". Trans. N. Y. Acad. Sci., Volume 36, Issue 7 (1974), Series II, pp. 640–643. Levi Howard (1974). "A Geometric Construction of the Dirichlet Kernel". Transactions of the New York Academy of Sciences. 36 (7 Series II): 640–643. doi:10.1111/j.2164-0947.1974.tb03023.x.
- "An algebraic reformulation of the four color theorem." (published posthumously by Don Coppersmith, Melvin Fitting, and Paul Meyer) (LINK)

==== Expository writing ====
- "Why Arithmetic Works.", The Mathematics Teacher, Vol. 56, No. 1 (January 1963), pp. 2–7. (LINK)
- "Plane Geometries in Terms of Projections.", Proc. Am. Math. Soc, 1965, Vol. 16, No. 3, pp. 503–511. (LINK)
- "An Algebraic Approach to Calculus.", Trans. N. Y. Acad. Sci., Volume 28, Issue 3 Series II, pp. 375–377, January 1966 Levi Howard (1966). "An Algebraic Approach to Calculus". Transactions of the New York Academy of Sciences. 28 (3 Series II): 375–377. doi:10.1111/j.2164-0947.1966.tb02349.x.
- "Classroom Notes: Integration, Anti-Differentiation and a Converse to the Mean Value Theorem", Amer. Math. Monthly 74 (1967), no. 5, 585–586. (LINK)
- "Foundations of Geometric Algebra", Rendiconti di Matematica, 1969, Vol. 2, Serie VI, pp. 1–32.
- "Geometric Algebra for the High School Program.", Educational Studies in Mathematics, June 1971, Volume 3, Issue 3–4, pp 490–500. (LINK)
- "Geometric Versions of Some Algebraic Identities.", Ann. N. Y. Acad. Sci., Vol. 607, pp. 54–60, November 1990.
