= Remote point =

In general topology, a remote point is a point $p$ that belongs to the Stone–Čech compactification $\beta X$ of a Tychonoff space $X$ but that does not belong to the topological closure within $\beta X$ of any nowhere dense subset of $X$.

Let $\R$ be the real line with the standard topology. In 1962, Nathan Fine and Leonard Gillman proved that, assuming the continuum hypothesis:

There exists a point $p$ in $\beta \R$ that is not in the closure of any discrete subset of $\R$ ...

Their proof works for any Tychonoff space that is separable and not pseudocompact.

Chae and Smith proved that the existence of remote points is independent, in terms of Zermelo–Fraenkel set theory, of the continuum hypothesis for a class of topological spaces that includes metric spaces. Several other mathematical theorems have been proved concerning remote points.
