= Jacobi bound problem =

The Jacobi bound problem concerns the veracity of Jacobi's inequality which is an inequality on the absolute dimension of a differential algebraic variety in terms of its defining equations. This is one of Kolchin's Problems.

The inequality is the differential algebraic analog of Bézout's theorem in affine space. Although first formulated by Jacobi, In 1936 Joseph Ritt recognized the problem as non-rigorous in that Jacobi didn't even have a rigorous notion of absolute dimension (Jacobi and Ritt used the term "order" - which Ritt first gave a rigorous definition for using the notion of transcendence degree). Intuitively, the absolute dimension is the number of constants of integration required to specify a solution of a system of ordinary differential equations. A mathematical proof of the inequality has been open since 1936.

== Statement ==
Let $(K,\partial)$ be a differential field of characteristic zero and consider $\Gamma$ a differential algebraic variety determined by the vanishing of differential polynomials $u_1,\ldots,u_n \in K\lbrace x_1,\ldots,x_n\rbrace$. If $\Gamma_1$ is an irreducible component of $\Gamma$ of finite absolute dimension then

$a(\Gamma_1) \leq J(u_1,u_2,\ldots,u_n).$

In the above display $J(u_1,u_2,\ldots,u_n)$ is the *jacobi number*. It is defined to be

$\max_{\sigma \in S_n} \sum_{i=1}^n \operatorname{ord}_{x_i}^{\partial}(u_{\sigma(i)})$.
