= Difference algebra =

Difference algebra is a branch of mathematics concerned with the study of difference (or functional) equations from the algebraic point of view. Difference algebra is analogous to differential algebra but concerned with difference equations rather than differential equations. As an independent subject it was initiated by Joseph Ritt and his student Richard Cohn.

== Difference rings, difference fields and difference algebras ==
A difference ring is a commutative ring $R$ together with a ring endomorphism $\sigma\colon R\to R$. Often it is assumed that $\sigma$ is injective. When $R$ is a field one speaks of a difference field. A classical example of a difference field is the field $K=\mathbb{C}(x)$ of rational functions with the difference operator $\sigma$ given by $\sigma(f(x))=f(x+1)$. The role of difference rings in difference algebra is similar to the role of commutative rings in commutative algebra and algebraic geometry. A morphism of difference rings is a morphism of rings that commutes with $\sigma$. A difference algebra over a difference field $K$ is a difference ring $R$ with a $K$-algebra structure such that $K\to R$ is a morphism of difference rings, i.e. $\sigma\colon R\to R$ extends $\sigma\colon K\to K$. A difference algebra that is a field is called a difference field extension.

== Algebraic difference equations ==
The difference polynomial ring $K\{y\}=K\{y_1,\ldots,y_n\}$ over a difference field $K$ in the (difference) variables $y_1,\ldots,y_n$ is the polynomial ring over $K$ in the infinitely many variables $\sigma^i(y_j),\ (i\in\mathbb{N}, 1\leq j\leq n)$. It becomes a difference algebra over $K$ by extending $\sigma$ from $K$ to $K\{y\}$ as suggested by the naming of the variables.

By a system of algebraic difference equations over $K$ one means any subset $F$ of $K\{y\}$. If $R$ is a difference algebra over $K$ the solutions of $F$ in $R$ are

$$\mathbb{V}_R(F)=\{a\in R^n|\ f(a)=0 \text{ for all } f\in F\}.$$

Classically one is mainly interested in solutions in difference field extensions of $K$. For example, if $K=\mathbb{C}(x)$ and $R$ is the field of meromorphic functions on $\mathbb{C}$ with difference operator $\sigma$ given by $\sigma(f(x)) = f(x+1)$, then the fact that the gamma function $\Gamma$ satisfies the functional equation $\Gamma(x+1) = x\Gamma(x)$ can be restated abstractly as $\Gamma\in\mathbb{V}_R(\sigma(y_1)-xy_1)$.

== Difference varieties ==
Intuitively, a difference variety over a difference field $K$ is the set of solutions of a system of algebraic difference equations over $K$. This definition has to be made more precise by specifying where one is looking for the solutions. Usually one is looking for solutions in the so-called universal family of difference field extensions of $K$. Alternatively, one may define a difference variety as a functor from the category of difference field extensions of $K$ to the category of sets, which is of the form $R\rightsquigarrow \mathbb{V}_R(F)$ for some $F\subseteq K\{y\}$.

There is a one-to-one correspondence between the difference varieties defined by algebraic difference equations in the variables $y_1,\ldots,y_n$ and certain ideals in $K\{y\}$, namely the perfect difference ideals of $K\{y\}$. One of the basic theorems in difference algebra asserts that every ascending chain of perfect difference ideals in $K\{y\}$ is finite. This result can be seen as a difference analog of Hilbert's basis theorem.

== Applications ==
Difference algebra is related to many other mathematical areas, such as discrete dynamical systems, combinatorics, number theory, or model theory. While some real life problems, such as population dynamics, can be modeled by algebraic difference equations, difference algebra also has applications in pure mathematics. For example, there is a proof of the Manin–Mumford conjecture using methods of difference algebra. The model theory of difference fields has been studied.

== See also ==
- Finite difference
- Recurrence relation
- Functional equation
- Differential algebra
