= Lie–Kolchin theorem =

Theorem in the representation theory of linear algebraic groups

In mathematics, the Lie–Kolchin theorem is a theorem in the representation theory of linear algebraic groups; Lie's theorem is the analog for linear Lie algebras.

It states that if G is a connected and solvable linear algebraic group defined over an algebraically closed field and

$$\rho\colon G \to GL(V)$$

a representation on a nonzero finite-dimensional vector space V, then there is a 1-dimensional linear subspace L of V such that

$$\rho(G)(L) = L.$$

That is, ρ(G) has an invariant line L, on which G therefore acts through a 1-dimensional representation. This is equivalent to the statement that V contains a nonzero vector v that is a common (simultaneous) eigenvector for all $\rho(g), \,\, g \in G$.

It follows directly that every irreducible finite-dimensional representation of a connected and solvable linear algebraic group G has dimension 1. In fact, this is another way to state the Lie–Kolchin theorem.

The result for Lie algebras was proved by Sophus Lie (1876) and for algebraic groups was proved by Ellis Kolchin (1948, p.19).

The Borel fixed point theorem generalizes the Lie–Kolchin theorem.

== Triangularization ==
Sometimes the theorem is also referred to as the Lie–Kolchin triangularization theorem because by induction it implies that with respect to a suitable basis of V the image $\rho(G)$ has a triangular shape; in other words, the image group $\rho(G)$ is conjugate in GL(n,K) (where n = dim V) to a subgroup of the group T of upper triangular matrices, the standard Borel subgroup of GL(n,K): the image is simultaneously triangularizable.

The theorem applies in particular to a Borel subgroup of a semisimple linear algebraic group G.

== Counter-example ==
If the field K is not algebraically closed, the theorem can fail. The standard unit circle, viewed as the set of complex numbers $\{ x+iy \in \mathbb{C} \mid x^2+y^2=1 \}$ of absolute value one is a 1-dimensional commutative (and therefore solvable) linear algebraic group over the real numbers which has a 2-dimensional representation into the special orthogonal group SO(2) without an invariant (real) line. Here the image $\rho(z)$ of $z=x+iy$ is the orthogonal matrix

$$\begin{pmatrix} x & y \\ -y & x \end{pmatrix}.$$
