= Differential algebraic group =

In mathematics, a differential algebraic group is a differential algebraic variety with a compatible group structure. Differential algebraic groups were introduced by Cassidy (1972).
