= Edgar Lorch =

Swiss American mathematician (1907–1990)

- Born: July 22, 1907; Nyon, Switzerland
- Died: March 5, 1990 (aged 82); Manhattan, New York, U.S.
- Education: Columbia University
- Scientific career
- Fields: Mathematics
- Workplaces: Columbia University
- Thesis: Elementary Transformations (1933)
- Doctoral advisor: Joseph Ritt
- Doctoral students: Hing Tong; Al Goodman; Leonard Gillman; Alan Hoffman; John Jayne; Thomas Lupo

Edgar Raymond Lorch (July 22, 1907 – March 5, 1990) was a Swiss American mathematician. Described by The New York Times as "a leader in the development of modern mathematics theory", he was a professor of mathematics at Columbia University. He contributed to the fields general topology, especially metrizable and Baire spaces, group theory of permutation groups and functional analysis, especially spectral theory, convexity in Hilbert spaces and normed rings.

== Biography ==
Born in Switzerland, Lorch emigrated with his family to the United States in 1917 and became a citizen in 1932. He joined the faculty of Columbia University in 1935 and retired in 1976, although he continued to write and lecture as professor emeritus. For his reminiscences of Szeged, Lorch posthumously received in 1994 the Lester R. Ford Award, with Reuben Hersh as editor.
