= Ellis Kolchin =

American mathematician (1916–1991)

- Born: April 18, 1916; New York City, U.S.
- Died: October 30, 1991 (aged 75); New York City, U.S.
- Education: Columbia University
- Known for: Lie–Kolchin theorem Kolchin topology
- Scientific career
- Fields: Mathematics
- Workplaces: Columbia University
- Thesis: On the Exponents of Differential Ideals (1941)
- Doctoral advisor: Joseph Ritt
- Doctoral students: Azriel Rosenfeld; Irving Adler; Alexandru Buium

Ellis Robert Kolchin (April 18, 1916 – October 30, 1991) was an American mathematician at Columbia University. He is best known for his work in differential algebra and especially differential Galois theory.

Kolchin earned a doctorate in mathematics from Columbia University in 1941 under supervision of Joseph Ritt. Shortly after he served in the South Pacific in World War II. He was awarded a Guggenheim Fellowship in 1954 and 1961.

Kolchin worked on differential algebra and its relation to differential equations, and founded the modern theory of linear algebraic groups. He developed many of the basic theorems including an analog of the Hilbert Basis Theorem further developing the Galois theory of differential equations started by Liouville. He is an celebrated figure in differential algebra and his book Differential Algebra and Algebraic Groups has been extremely influential in differential algebra, model theory and beyond.

In a book review, Blum writes: This book, published after years of careful preparation, is a tour de force of the highest proportions. The author, as is well known, is the leading authority in the field of differential algebra. There are few people working in this area who have not benefited enormously through personal contact with him and none who have not been influenced by his publications. His goal here is to present a unified exposition of the subject, in an algebraic setting, presuming no more than a standard first year graduate course in algebra.

He gave a famous plenary address at the International Congress of Mathematicians in 1966 (Moscow) where he outlined Kolchin's problems, a famous collection of unsolved problems in differential algebra.

His seminar in differential algebra, the Kolchin Seminar, was the longest ongoing mathematics seminar at Columbia University, ran for over 30 years. It is currently run by the City University of New York.

His doctoral students include Azriel Rosenfeld, Irving Adler, and (unofficially) Alexandru Buium.

== See also ==
- Kolchin topology
- Lie–Kolchin theorem
- Picard–Vessiot theory
- Kolchin-Schmidt Conjecture
- Jacobi Bound Conjecture
- Ritt Problem
- Kolchin Catenary Conjecture

== Publications ==
- Kolchin, E. R. (1985), Differential algebraic groups, Pure and Applied Mathematics, vol. 114, Boston, MA: Academic Press, ISBN 978-0-12-417640-9, MR 0776230
- Kolchin, E. R. (1973), Differential algebra and algebraic groups, Pure and Applied Mathematics, vol. 54, Boston, MA: Academic Press, ISBN 978-0-12-417650-8, MR 0568864
- Kolchin, Ellis (1999), Selected works of Ellis Kolchin with commentary, Providence, R.I.: American Mathematical Society, ISBN 978-0-8218-0542-8, MR 1677530
