= Leonard Gillman =

American mathematician (1917–2009)

- Born: January 8, 1917; Cleveland, Ohio, US
- Died: April 7, 2009 (aged 92); Austin, Texas, US
- Education: Juilliard Graduate School of Music, Columbia University
- Known for: Topology
- Scientific career
- Fields: Mathematician, pianist
- Workplaces: Purdue University, University of Rochester, University of Texas at Austin
- Doctoral advisor: Edgar Lorch; Alfred Tarski

Leonard E. Gillman (January 8, 1917 – April 7, 2009) was an American mathematician, emeritus professor at the University of Texas at Austin. He was also an accomplished classical pianist.

== Biography ==
=== Early life and education ===
Gillman was born in Cleveland, Ohio in 1917. His family moved to Pittsburgh, Pennsylvania in 1922. It was there that he started taking piano lessons at age six. They moved to New York City in 1926, and he began intensive training as a pianist. Upon graduation from high school in 1933, Gillman won a fellowship to the Juilliard Graduate School of Music.

=== Career ===
After one semester at Juilliard, he enrolled in evening classes in French and mathematics at Columbia University. He received a diploma in piano from Juilliard in 1938, then continued his studies at Columbia, graduating with a B.S. in mathematics in 1941. He stayed on as a graduate student, and completed the coursework for a mathematics Ph.D. by 1943.

In 1943, Gillman accepted a position at Tufts College, working on a special project for the Navy Department. While there he wrote a thesis based on their work on pursuit curves, and he received his master's degree from Columbia in 1945. He moved to Washington, D.C. where he continued doing Navy work for the Operations Evaluation Group (OEG), affiliated with the Massachusetts Institute of Technology. After five years he took a one-year sabbatical at MIT to write a doctoral thesis. Originally he intended for it to be on game theory, but he happened to read a book by Wacław Sierpiński and became suddenly interested in set theory. With no specialists to advise him, Gillman wrote and published a paper that became his thesis: "On Intervals of Ordered Sets". He also sent the paper to Alfred Tarski, beginning a correspondence that led Tarski to claim Gillman as "my Ph.D. by mail". In 1952, Gillman accepted an instructorship at Purdue University, and in 1953 he finally received his Ph.D. in mathematics from Columbia.

At Purdue, he began to do research in topology, in collaboration with Melvin Henriksen, Meyer Jerison, and others. This work concentrated on the ring of all real-valued continuous functions whose domain is a given topological space. They explored the relationships between topological properties of the space and algebraic properties of the ring. Gillman and Henriksen defined and characterized the classes of P-spaces and F-spaces, and Gillman and Jerison published an entire textbook on the subject: Rings of Continuous Functions, ISBN 0-387-90198-1.

In 1958, Gillman was awarded a Guggenheim Fellowship, and he spent the next two years as a visiting member at the Institute for Advanced Study. He and former OEG colleague Nathan Fine defined remote points and showed that if the continuum hypothesis holds, then the real line (or any separable Tychonoff space that is not pseudocompact) has remote points.

In 1960, he became chairman of the department of mathematics at the University of Rochester. He was active in recruiting top mathematicians to the department, including Arthur Harold Stone and his wife Dorothy Maharam. At Rochester, Gillman also became involved in activities of the Mathematical Association of America (MAA). In 1969 he was appointed a regional Associate Secretary of the American Mathematical Society, but he had to give it up after moving to the University of Texas that same year. He chaired the UT mathematics department until 1973, when he was elected Treasurer of the MAA. He held this office for 13 years. Gillman retired from UT in 1987 and served as President of the MAA for the term 1987–1988. Leonard Gillman received a Lester R. Ford Award in 1994 and again in 2003.

Gillman died on April 7, 2009 in Austin, Texas.

=== Music aspirations ===
Gillman was involved in local classical music everywhere he worked, and performed four times at the Joint Mathematics Meeting, twice with William Browder.

== Selected publications ==
- Erdős, P.; Gillman, L.; Henriksen, M. (May 1955). "An Isomorphism Theorem for Real-Closed Fields". Annals of Mathematics. Second Series. 61 (3): 542–554. doi:10.2307/1969812. JSTOR 1969812.
- Gillman, Leonard; Henriksen, Melvin (July 1956). "Rings of continuous functions in which every finitely generated ideal is principal". Transactions of the American Mathematical Society. 82 (2): 366–391. doi:10.2307/1993054. JSTOR 1993054.
- Fine, N.J.; Gillman, L. (February 1962). "Remote points in βR". Proceedings of the American Mathematical Society. 13 (1): 29–36. doi:10.2307/2033766. JSTOR 2033766.
- Gillman, Leonard (June 1987). Writing Mathematics Well: A Manual for Authors. Mathematical Association of America. ISBN 978-0-88385-443-3.
- Gillman, Leonard (January 1992). "The Car and the Goats". American Mathematical Monthly. 99 (1): 3–7. doi:10.2307/2324540. JSTOR 2324540.
- Gillman, Leonard (January 1993). "An Axiomatic Approach to the Integral" (PDF). American Mathematical Monthly. 100 (1): 16–25. doi:10.2307/2324809. JSTOR 2324809. Archived from the original (PDF) on March 23, 2012. (winner of a 1994 Lester R. Ford Award for expository writing)
- Gillman, Leonard (June–July 2002). "Two Classical Surprises Concerning the Axiom of Choice and the Continuum Hypothesis" (PDF). American Mathematical Monthly. 109 (6): 544–553. doi:10.2307/2695444. JSTOR 2695444. Archived from the original (PDF) on March 23, 2012. (2003 Lester R. Ford Award winner)
