= Kolchin's problems =

Kolchin's problems are a set of unsolved problems in differential algebra, outlined by Ellis Kolchin at the International Congress of Mathematicians in 1966 (Moscow)

== Kolchin Catenary Conjecture ==
The Kolchin Catenary Conjecture is a fundamental open problem in differential algebra related to dimension theory.

=== Statement ===
"Let $\Sigma$ be a differential algebraic variety of dimension $d$. By a long gap chain we mean a chain of irreducible differential subvarieties $\Sigma_0 \subset \Sigma_1 \subset \Sigma_2 \subset \cdots$ of ordinal number length $\omega^m \cdot d$."

Given an irreducible differential variety $\Sigma$ of dimension $d > 0$ and an arbitrary point $p \in \Sigma$ , does there exist a long gap chain beginning at $p$ and ending at $\Sigma$?

The positive answer to this question is called the Kolchin catenary conjecture.
