= Borel fixed-point theorem =

Fixed-point theorem in algebraic geometry

In mathematics, the Borel fixed-point theorem is a fixed-point theorem in algebraic geometry generalizing the Lie–Kolchin theorem. The result was proved by Armand Borel (1956).

== Statement ==
If G is a connected, solvable, linear algebraic group acting regularly on a non-empty, complete algebraic variety V over an algebraically closed field k, then there is a G fixed-point of V.

The Lie-Kolchin theorem proves this result under the stronger hypothesis that V is a projective variety.

A more general version of the theorem holds over a field k that is not necessarily algebraically closed. A solvable algebraic group G is split over k or k-split if G admits a composition series whose composition factors are isomorphic (over k) to the additive group $\mathbb G_a$ or the multiplicative group $\mathbb G_m$. If G is a connected, k-split solvable algebraic group acting regularly on a complete variety V having a k-rational point, then there is a G(k) fixed-point of V(k).
