= Nathan Fine =

American mathematician (1916–1994)

Nathan Jacob Fine
- Born: October 22, 1916; Philadelphia, USA
- Died: November 18, 1994 (aged 78); Deerfield Beach, Florida, USA
- Citizenship: American
- Education: University of Pennsylvania
- Occupation: Mathematician
- Notable work: Basic Hypergeometric Series and Applications

Nathan Jacob Fine (22 October 1916 in Philadelphia – 18 November 1994 in Deerfield Beach, Florida) was an American mathematician who worked on basic hypergeometric series.

== Сareer ==
He is best known for his lecture notes on the subject which for four decades served as an inspiration to experts in the field until they were finally published as a book. He solved the Jeep problem in 1946.

Nathan Fine retired in 1978, as a professor at Pennsylvania State University. Prior to that he had been on the faculties of the University of Pennsylvania and Cornell University. For a brief period (1946–1947) he also worked at the Operations Evaluation Group, affiliated with the Massachusetts Institute of Technology. Beside the book he published about 40 papers in several fields of mathematics. He is known for the Rogers-Fine identity.

Nathan Fine received his Ph.D. in 1946 from University of Pennsylvania, where he was a student of Antoni Zygmund. Fine was at the Institute for Advanced Study for the three academic years 1953–1954, 1958–1959, and 1959–1960. Fine's doctoral students include J. J. Price.

He wrote the book Basic Hypergeometric Series and Applications ISBN 0-8218-1524-5.

== Selected publications ==
- ——; Niven, Ivan (1944). "The probability that a determinant be congruent to a (mod m)". Bulletin of the American Mathematical Society. 50 (2): 89–94. doi:10.1090/S0002-9904-1944-08085-3.
- —— (1948). "Some New Results on Partitions". Proceedings of the National Academy of Sciences of the United States of America. 34 (12): 616–618. Bibcode:1948PNAS...34..616F. doi:10.1073/pnas.34.12.616. JSTOR 88084. PMC 1079179. PMID 16588844.
- —— (1949). "On the Walsh functions". Transactions of the American Mathematical Society. 65 (3): 372–414. doi:10.1090/S0002-9947-1949-0032833-2.
- —— (1950). "Proof of a theorem of Jacobi". Proceedings of the American Mathematical Society. 1 (5): 666–667. doi:10.1090/S0002-9939-1950-0038397-5.
- —— (1950). "The generalized Walsh functions". Transactions of the American Mathematical Society. 69: 66–77. doi:10.1090/S0002-9947-1950-0042535-2.
- —— (1951). "Note on the Hurwitz zeta-function". Proceedings of the American Mathematical Society. 2 (3): 361–364. doi:10.1090/S0002-9939-1951-0043194-1.
- —— (1954). "On the asymptotic distribution of certain sums". Proceedings of the American Mathematical Society. 5 (2): 243–252. doi:10.1090/S0002-9939-1954-0064337-2.
- —— (1955). "Cesàro Summability of Walsh-Fourier Series". Proceedings of the National Academy of Sciences. 41 (8): 588–591. Bibcode:1955PNAS...41..588F. doi:10.1073/pnas.41.8.588. PMC 528139. PMID 16578449.
- —— (1957). "Fourier-Stieltjes series of Walsh functions". Transactions of the American Mathematical Society. 86: 246–255. doi:10.1090/S0002-9947-1957-0091371-6.
- ——; Gillman, L. (1960). "Extension of continuous functions in $\beta N$". Bulletin of the American Mathematical Society. 66 (5): 376–382. doi:10.1090/S0002-9904-1960-10460-0.
- ——; Gillman, L. (1962). "Remote points in $\beta R$". Proceedings of the American Mathematical Society. 13: 29. doi:10.1090/S0002-9939-1962-0143172-5.
- ——; Wilf, H. S. (1965). "Uniqueness theorems for periodic functions". Proceedings of the American Mathematical Society. 16: 109–114. doi:10.1090/S0002-9939-1965-0174934-9.
- —— (1965). "The distribution of the sum of digits (mod p)". Bulletin of the American Mathematical Society. 71 (4): 651–653. doi:10.1090/S0002-9904-1965-11381-7.
