= Wu Wenjun =

Chinese mathematician (1919–2017)

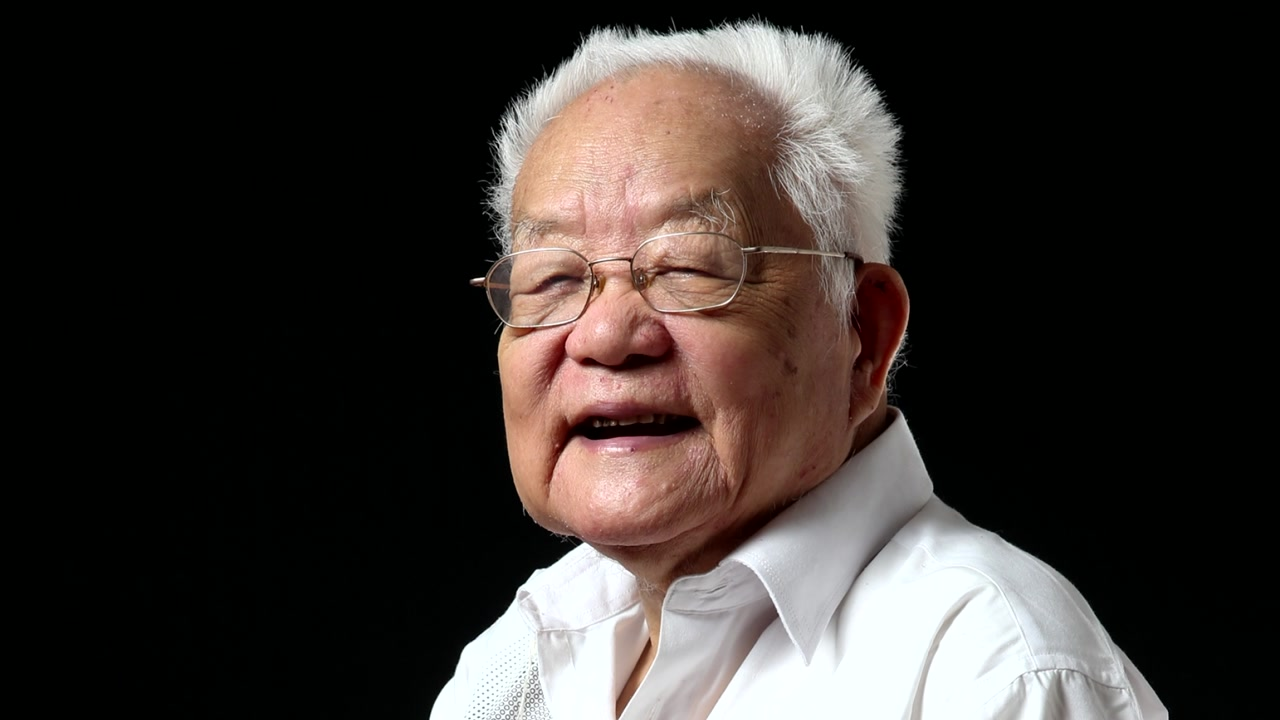
- Born: 12 May 1919; Shanghai, China
- Died: 7 May 2017 (aged 97); Beijing, People's Republic of China
- Education: Shanghai Jiao Tong University; University of Strasbourg
- Awards: Shaw Prize in Mathematics (2006); Highest Science and Technology Award (2000)
- Scientific career
- Fields: Mathematics
- Doctoral advisor: Charles Ehresmann

Chinese name
- Traditional Chinese: 吳文俊
- Simplified Chinese: 吴文俊
Transcriptions
Standard Mandarin
- Hanyu Pinyin: Wú Wénjùn
- Wade–Giles: Wu Wen-chün

Wu Wenjun (Chinese: 吴文俊; 12 May 1919 – 7 May 2017), also commonly known as Wu Wen-tsün, was a Chinese mathematician, historian, and writer. He was an academician at the Chinese Academy of Sciences (CAS), best known for Wu manifold, Wu class, Wu formula, and Wu's method of characteristic set.

== Biography ==
Wu's ancestral hometown was Jiashan, Zhejiang. He was born in Shanghai in 1919.

Wu graduated from Shanghai Jiao Tong University in 1940. In 1945, he taught several months at Hangchow University (later merged into Zhejiang University) in Hangzhou.

In 1947, he went to France for further study at the University of Strasbourg. In 1949, he received his PhD from that university, for his thesis Sur les classes caractéristiques des structures fibrées sphériques, written under the direction of Charles Ehresmann. Afterwards, he did some work in Paris with René Thom and discovered the Wu class and Wu formula in algebraic topology.

In 1951 he was appointed to a post at Peking University. However, Wu may have been among a wave of recalls of Chinese academics working in the West following Chiang Kai-shek's ouster from the mainland in 1949, according to eyewitness testimony by Marcel Berger, as he disappeared from France one day, without saying a word to anyone. He returned to China in 1951.

== Honors and awards ==
In 1957, he was elected as an academician of the Chinese Academy of Sciences. In 1986 he was an Invited Speaker of the ICM in Berkeley. In 1990, he was elected as an academician of The World Academy of Sciences (TWAS).

Along with Yuan Longping, he was awarded the State Preeminent Science and Technology Award by President Jiang Zemin in 2000, when this highest scientific and technological prize in China began to be awarded. He also received the TWAS Prize in 1990 and the Shaw Prize in 2006. He was the President of the Chinese society of mathematics. He died on 7 May 2017, 5 days before his 98th birthday.

== Research ==
The research of Wu includes the following fields: algebraic topology, algebraic geometry, game theory, history of mathematics, automated theorem proving. His most important contributions are to algebraic topology. The Wu class and the Wu formula are named after him. In the field of automated theorem proving, he is known for Wu's method. Wu's is generally viewed as a pioneer of early artificial intelligence research.

He was also active in the field of the history of Chinese mathematics. He was the chief editor of the ten-volume Grand Series of Chinese Mathematics, covering the time from antiquity to late part of the Qin dynasty.

In the 1970s, Wu studied ancient Chinese mathematics and concluded that traditional Chinese disciplinary practices differed from the axiomatic mathematics that originated in Greece. In Wu's view, Chinese mathematics were highly systemized and practical, which contrasted with the logic approach which is at the core of Western geometry. Rather than a focus on theorems, ancient Chinese mathematics emphasized precise and simple problem solving derived from the need to solve practical tasks of administration like dividing fields and calculating food rations.

Wu contended that the binary system attributed to Gottfried Wilhelm Leibniz is an imitation of a systemic understanding of reasoning that Chinese scholars had been working with for centuries previously. Leibniz had corresponded extensively with Chinese missionaries in China.

== Publications ==
- Wen-Tsun, Wu:Rational Homotopy Type: A Constructive Study Via the Theory of the I*-Measure ISBN 0-387-13611-8
- Wen-tsun, Wu & Min-de, Cheng, CHINESE MATHEMATICS INTO THE 21ST CENTURY
- Wen-tsun, Wu, A THEORY OF IMBEDDING IMMERSION AND ISOTOPY OF POLYTOPES IN A EUCLIDEAN SPACE
- Wen-tsun, Wu, Mechanical Theorem Proving in Geometries. ISBN 3211825061
- Wen-Tsun, Wu; Georges Reeb: Sur Les Espaces Fibrés Et Les Variétés Feuilletées
- SELECT WORKS OF WEN-TSUN WU ISBN 9789812791078
- Wen-tsun, Wu: Mathematics Mechanization: Mechanical Geometry Theorem-Proving, Mechanical Geometry Problem-Solving and Polynomial Equations-Solving ISBN 0-7923-5835-X
- Wen-Tsun, Wu, and Hu Guo-Ding, eds, Computer Mathematics ISBN 9810215282 .
