= Paul J. Nahin =

American engineer and author (born 1940)

- Born: November 26, 1940; Berkeley, California, U.S.
- Education: Stanford University; California Institute of Technology; University of California, Irvine
- Occupations: Professor, author
- Known for: Books on physics and mathematics
- Spouse: Patricia A. Telepka (m. 1962)
- Awards: Harry Rowe Mimno Award (1979); Chandler Davis Prize (2017)

Paul J. Nahin (born November 26, 1940) is an American electrical engineer, author, and former college professor. He has written over 20 books on topics in physics and mathematics.

== Biography ==
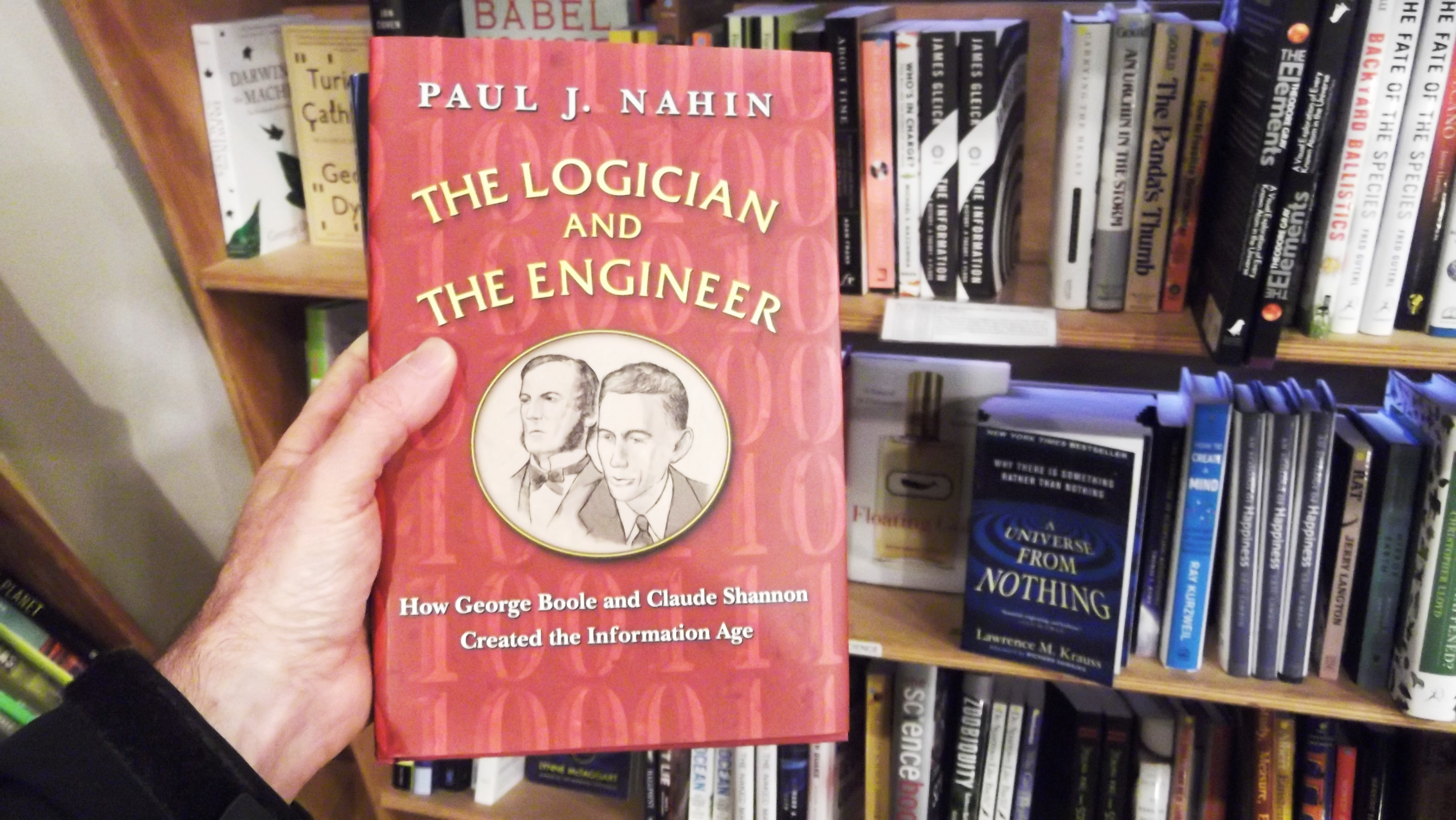
A copy of Nahin's book The Logician and the Engineer

Born in California, Nahin graduated from Brea Olinda High School in 1958, and thereafter received a B.S. from Stanford University in 1962, an M.S. from the California Institute of Technology in 1963, and a Ph.D. from the University of California, Irvine, in 1972, all in electrical engineering.

Nahin thereafter taught at Harvey Mudd College, the University of Virginia, and the Naval Postgraduate School in Monterey, California. He retired in 2004 from his position as professor of electrical engineering at the University of New Hampshire, becoming a professor emeritus.

As an author, Nahin's publications include biographies of Oliver Heaviside, George Boole, and Claude Shannon, books on mathematical concepts such as Euler's formula, the Riemann zeta function, and the imaginary unit, and a number of books on the physics and philosophical puzzles of time travel. His book Chases and Escapes has been rated as essential for inclusion in undergraduate mathematics libraries by The Basic Library List Committee of the Mathematical Association of America.

In 1979, Nahin received the first Harry Rowe Mimno writing award, from the IEEE Aerospace and Electronic Systems Society. He received the 2017 Chandler Davis Prize for Excellence in Expository Writing in Mathematics.

== Works ==
- The Mathematical Radio: Inside the Magic of AM, FM, and Single-Sideband (2024)
- The Probability Integral: Its Origin, Its Importance, and Its Calculation (2023)
- In Pursuit of Zeta-3 : The World's Most Mysterious Unsolved Math Problem. Princeton University Press. 2021. ISBN 978-0-691-22759-7. OCLC 1260168397.
- Hot Molecules, Cold Electrons: From the Mathematics of Heat to the Development of the Trans-Atlantic Telegraph (2020)
- Transients for Electrical Engineers: Elementary Switched-Circuit Analysis in the Time and Laplace Transform Domains (with a touch of MATLAB®) (2018)
- How to Fall Slower Than Gravity: And Other Everyday (and Not So Everyday) Uses of Mathematics and Physical Reasoning (2018)
- Time Machine Tales: The Science Fiction Adventures and Philosophical Puzzles of Time Travel. Springer. 2017. ISBN 978-3319488622.
- In Praise of Simple Physics: The Science and Mathematics behind Everyday Questions (2016)
- Inside Interesting Integrals (2014); pbk edition
- Holy Sci-Fi!: Where Science Fiction and Religion Intersect (2014)
- Will You Be Alive in 10 Years?: And Numerous Other Curious Questions in Probability (2014)
- The Logician and the Engineer: How George Boole and Claude Shannon Created the Information Age (2012); 2017 pbk edition
- When Least Is Best: How Mathematicians Discovered Many Clever Ways to Make Things as Small (or as Large) as Possible (2011);
- Number-Crunching: Taming Unruly Computational Problems from Mathematical Physics to Science Fiction (2011)
- Dr. Euler's Fabulous Formula: Cures Many Mathematical Ills (2011) 2017 pbk edition
- Digital Dice: Computational Solutions to Practical Probability Problems (2008); 2013 pbk edition
- Time Travel: A Writer's Guide to the Real Science of Plausible Time Travel (1997); 2011 pbk edition
- Mrs. Perkins's Electric Quilt: And Other Intriguing Stories of Mathematical Physics (2009)
- Chases and Escapes: The Mathematics of Pursuit and Evasion (2007; reprinted in paperback 2012)
- Time Machines: Time Travel in Physics, Metaphysics, and Science Fiction (2001)
- The Science of Radio: With MATLAB and Electronics Workbench Demonstrations, 2nd Edition (2001)
- Duelling Idiots and Other Probability Puzzlers (2000); 2012 pbk edition
- An Imaginary Tale: The Story of √-1 (1998)
- Oliver Heaviside: Sage in Solitude : The Life, Work, and Times of an Electrical Genius of the Victorian Age (1988) 2002 pbk edition
