= Mice problem =

Mathematical problem

Four mice

Three mice

Six mice

In mathematics, the mice problem is a continuous pursuit–evasion problem in which a number of mice (or insects, dogs, missiles, etc.) are considered to be placed at the corners of a regular polygon. In the classic setup, each then begins to move towards its immediate neighbour (clockwise or anticlockwise). The goal is often to find out at what time the mice meet.

The most common version has the mice starting at the corners of a unit square, moving at unit speed. In this case they meet after a time of one unit, because the distance between two neighboring mice always decreases at a speed of one unit. More generally, for a regular polygon of $n$ unit-length sides, the distance between neighboring mice decreases at a speed of $1 - \cos(2\pi/n)$, so they meet after a time of $1/\bigl(1 - \cos(2\pi/n)\bigr)$.

== Path of the mice ==
For all regular polygons, each mouse traces out a pursuit curve in the shape of a logarithmic spiral. These curves meet in the center of the polygon.

== In media ==
In Dara Ó Briain: School of Hard Sums, the mice problem is discussed. Instead of 4 mice, 4 ballroom dancers are used.

== Whirl ==
A whirl with alternating black and white squares

Connecting the locations of the mice at different intervals forms a whirl: a figure consisting of a sequence of nested polygons, each smaller and rotated relative to the previous.
