= Joseph Ritt =

American mathematician (1893–1951)

- Born: August 23, 1893; New York City, U.S.
- Died: January 5, 1951 (aged 57); New York City, U.S.
- Education: Columbia University
- Known for: Differential algebra
- Scientific career
- Fields: Mathematics
- Workplaces: Columbia University
- Thesis: On a General Class of Linear Homogeneous Differential Equations of Infinite Order with Constant Coefficients Preceded by a Note on the Resolution into Partial Fractions of the Reciprocal of an Entire Function of Genus Zero (1917)
- Doctoral advisor: Edward Kasner
- Doctoral students: Fritz Herzog; Ellis Kolchin; Howard Levi; Edgar Lorch

Joseph Fels Ritt (August 23, 1893 – January 5, 1951) was an American mathematician at Columbia University in the early 20th century. He is best known for his work on the theory of differential equations from the algebraic viewpoint, which he called differential algebra.

== Biography ==
Joseph Fels Ritt was born August 23, 1893 in New York City.

After beginning his undergraduate studies at City College of New York, Ritt received his B.A. from George Washington University in 1913. He then earned a doctorate in mathematics from Columbia University in 1917 under the supervision of Edward Kasner. After doing calculations for the war effort in World War I, he joined the Columbia faculty in 1921. He served as department chair from 1942 to 1945, and in 1945 became the Davies Professor of Mathematics. In 1932, George Washington University honored him with a Doctorate in Science, and in 1933 he was elected to join the United States National Academy of Sciences. He has 905 academic descendants listed in the Mathematics Genealogy Project, mostly through his student Ellis Kolchin, as of May 2024. Ritt was an Invited Speaker with talk Elementary functions and their inverses at the ICM in 1924 in Toronto and a Plenary Speaker at the ICM in 1950 in Cambridge, Massachusetts.

Ritt founded differential algebra theory, which was subsequently much developed by him and his student Ellis Kolchin.

He is known for his work on characterizing the indefinite integrals that can be solved in closed form, for his work on the theory of ordinary differential equations and partial differential equations, for beginning the study of differential algebraic groups, and for the method of characteristic sets used in the solution of systems of polynomial equations.

Despite his achievements, Ritt was never awarded any prize for his work - a fact which he resented, as he felt he was underappreciated. He once composed the following epitaph for himself:

Here at your feet J. F. Ritt lies;
He never won the Bôcher prize.

Ritt died January 5, 1951. He was buried in Mount Zion Cemetery; his grave does not bear the epitaph that he composed.

== Selected works ==
- Differential equations from the algebraic standpoint, New York, American Mathematical Society 1932
- Theory of Functions, New York 1945, 1947
- Integration in finite terms: Liouville's Theory of Elementary Methods, Columbia University Press 1948
- Differential Algebra, American Mathematical Society 1950, Dover 1966

== See also ==
- Ritt characteristic set
- Ritt theorem
- Ritt's polynomial decomposition theorem
