= Hilbert's thirteenth problem =

On solutions of 7th-degree equations

Hilbert's thirteenth problem is one of the 23 Hilbert problems set out in a celebrated list compiled in 1900 by David Hilbert. It entails proving whether a solution exists for all 7th-degree equations using algebraic (variant: continuous) functions of two arguments. It was first presented in the context of nomography, and in particular "nomographic construction" — a process whereby a function of several variables is constructed using functions of two variables. The variant for continuous functions was resolved affirmatively in 1957 by Vladimir Arnold when he proved the Kolmogorov–Arnold representation theorem, but the variant for algebraic functions remains unresolved.

== Introduction ==
Using the methods pioneered by Ehrenfried Walther von Tschirnhaus (1683), Erland Samuel Bring (1786), and George Jerrard (1834), William Rowan Hamilton showed in 1836 that every seventh-degree equation can be reduced via radicals to the form $x^7 + ax^3 + bx^2 + cx + 1 = 0$.

Regarding this equation, Hilbert asked whether its solution, x, considered as a function of the three variables a, b and c, can be expressed as the composition of a finite number of two-variable functions.

== History ==
Hilbert originally posed his problem for algebraic functions ("...Existenz von algebraischen Funktionen...", i.e., "...existence of algebraic functions..."; also see Abhyankar 1997, Vitushkin 2004). However, later in that article, Hilbert also conjectured there isn't a solution to a seventh-degree equation, even using arbitrary continuous functions in two variables.

A generalization of the second ("continuous") variant of the problem is the following question: can every continuous function of three variables be expressed as a composition of finitely many continuous functions of two variables? The affirmative answer to this general question was given in 1957 by Vladimir Arnold, then only nineteen years old and a student of Andrey Kolmogorov. Kolmogorov had shown in the previous year that any function of several variables can be constructed with a finite number of three-variable functions. Arnold then expanded on this work to show that only two-variable functions were in fact required, thus answering Hilbert's question when posed for the class of continuous functions. Later, Kolmogorov slightly simplified Arnold's result.

Arnold later returned to the algebraic version of the problem, jointly with Goro Shimura (Arnold and Shimura 1976).

== See also ==
- Septic equation
- Thomae's formula
