= Thomae's formula =

Relates theta constants to the branch points of a hyperelliptic curve

In mathematics, Thomae's formula is a formula introduced by Carl Johannes Thomae (1870) relating theta constants to the branch points of a hyperelliptic curve (Mumford 1984, section 8).

== History ==
In 1824, the Abel–Ruffini theorem established that polynomial equations of a degree of five or higher could have no solutions in radicals. It became clear to mathematicians since then that one needed to go beyond radicals in order to express the solutions to equations of the fifth and higher degrees. In 1858, Charles Hermite, Leopold Kronecker, and Francesco Brioschi independently discovered that the quintic equation could be solved with elliptic transcendents. This proved to be a generalization of the radical, which can be written as:
$$\sqrt[n]{x}=\exp \left({{\frac {1}{n}}\ln x}\right) = \exp \left(\frac{1}{n}\int^x_1\frac{dt}{t}\right).$$
With the restriction to only this exponential, as shown by Galois theory, only compositions of Abelian extensions may be constructed, which suffices only for equations of the fourth degree and below. Something more general is required for equations of higher degree, so to solve the quintic, Hermite, et al. replaced the exponential by an elliptic modular function and the integral (logarithm) by an elliptic integral. Kronecker believed that this was a special case of a still more general method. Camille Jordan showed that any algebraic equation may be solved by use of modular functions. This was accomplished by Thomae in 1870. Thomae generalized Hermite's approach by replacing the elliptic modular function with even more general Siegel modular forms and the elliptic integral by a hyperelliptic integral. Hiroshi Umemura expressed these modular functions in terms of higher genus theta functions.

== Formula ==
If we have a polynomial function:
$$f(x) = a_0 x^n + a_1 x^{n-1} + \cdots + a_n$$
with $a_0 \ne 0$, irreducible over a certain subfield of the complex numbers, then its roots $x_k$ may be expressed by the following equation involving theta functions of zero argument (where
$$\theta \begin{pmatrix} a\\ b\end{pmatrix}(\tau) = \theta_{a,b}(\tau,0)$$
are theta constants):
$$\begin{align}
x_k = {} & \left[\theta\left(
\begin{matrix}
1/2 & 0 & \cdots & 0 \\
0 & \cdots & 0 & 0
\end{matrix}
\right)(\Omega)\right]^4 \left[\theta\left(
\begin{matrix}
1/2 & 1/2 & 0 & \cdots & 0 \\
0 & \cdots & 0 & 0 & 0
\end{matrix}
\right)(\Omega)\right]^4 \\[6pt]
& {} + \left[\theta\left(
\begin{matrix}
0 & \cdots & 0 \\
0 & \cdots & 0
\end{matrix}
\right)(\Omega)\right]^4 \left[\theta\left(
\begin{matrix}
0 & 1/2 & 0 & \cdots & 0 \\
0 & 0 & 0 & \cdots & 0
\end{matrix}
\right)(\Omega)\right]^4 \\[6pt]
& {} - \frac{\left[\theta\left(
\begin{matrix}
0 & 0 & \cdots & 0 \\
1/2 & 0 & \cdots & 0
\end{matrix}
\right)(\Omega)\right]^4 \left[\theta\left(
\begin{matrix}
0 & 1/2 & 0 & \cdots & 0 \\
1/2 & 0 & \cdots & 0 & 0
\end{matrix}
\right)(\Omega)\right]^4}{
2 \left[\theta\left(
\begin{matrix}
1/2 & 0 & \cdots & 0 \\
0 & \cdots & 0 & 0
\end{matrix}
\right)(\Omega)\right]^4 \left[\theta\left(
\begin{matrix}
1/2 & 1/2 & 0 & \cdots & 0 \\
0 & 0 & \cdots & 0 & 0
\end{matrix}
\right)(\Omega)\right]^4
}
\end{align}$$
where $\Omega$ is the period matrix of the hyperelliptic curve $y^2 = F(x)$, where

$$\displaystyle
F(x) =
\begin{cases}
x(x - 1)f(x) & \text{if } 2 \nmid n \\
x(x - 1)(x - 2)f(x) & \text{if } 2 \mid n
\end{cases}$$

This formula applies to any algebraic equation of any degree without need for a Tschirnhaus transformation or any other manipulation to bring the equation into a specific normal form, such as the Bring–Jerrard form for the quintic. However, application of this formula in practice is difficult because the relevant hyperelliptic integrals and higher-genus theta functions are very complex.
