= Casus irreducibilis =

Cubic equation unsolvable in real radicals

Casus irreducibilis (from Latin 'the irreducible case') is the name given by mathematicians of the 16th century to cubic equations that cannot be solved in terms of real radicals, that is to those equations such that the computation of the solutions cannot be reduced to the computation of square and cube roots.

Cardano's formula for solution in radicals of a cubic equation was discovered at this time. It applies in the casus irreducibilis, but, in this case, requires the computation of the square root of a negative number, which involves knowledge of complex numbers, unknown at the time.

The casus irreducibilis occurs when the three solutions are real and distinct, or, equivalently, when the discriminant is positive.

It was only in 1843 that Pierre Wantzel proved that there cannot exist any solution in real radicals in the casus irreducibilis.

== The three cases of the discriminant ==
Let
$$ax^3+bx^2+cx+d=0$$
be a cubic equation with $a\ne0$. Then the discriminant is given by
$$D := \bigl((x_1-x_2)(x_1-x_3)(x_2-x_3)\bigr)^2 = 18abcd - 4ac^3 - 27a^2d^2 + b^2c^2 -4b^3d~.$$
It appears in the algebraic solution and is the square of the product
$$\Delta := \prod_{j<k}(x_j-x_k) = (x_1-x_2)(x_1-x_3)(x_2-x_3) \qquad \qquad \bigl(\!= \pm\sqrt{D}\bigr).$$
of differences of the 3 roots $x_1,x_2,x_3$. (The sign of $\Delta$ depends on the choice of an order on the roots.)

1. If D < 0, then the polynomial has one real root and two complex non-real roots. Cardano's formula involves cubic roots of real numbers. This is not casus irreducibilis since the one real root can be expressed using real square and cube roots.
2. If D = 0, then $\Delta=0$ and two of the roots are equal. These two roots are also a root of the derivative of the polynomial. So, they are also a root of the greatest common divisor of the polynomial and its derivative, which can be computed with the Euclidean algorithm for polynomials. It follows that the three roots are real, and if the coefficients are rational numbers, the same is true for the roots.
  That is, all the roots are expressible without radicals.
3. If D > 0, then $\Delta\in\R^\times$ is non-zero and real, and there are three distinct real roots which are expressed by Cardano's formula as sums of two complex conjugates cube roots.
  This case was called casus irreducibilis, because complex numbers were not known in the 16th century and the computation of the roots could not be reduced to the computation of square and cube roots.
  Using Galois theory, it was shown in the 19th century that, if the polynomial has rational coefficients and is irreducible over the rational numbers, the roots cannot be expressed in terms of real square and cube roots. (If the polynomial is reducible over the rational numbers, one of the roots is rational and the two others can be expressed in terms of a square root.)

== Formal statement and proof ==
More generally, suppose that F is a formally real field, and that p(x) ∈ F[x] is a cubic polynomial, irreducible over F, but having three real roots (roots in a real closure R of F). Then casus irreducibilis states that it is impossible to express a solution of p(x) = 0 by radicals in R.

To prove this, note that the discriminant D is positive. Form the field extension F(√D) = F(∆). Since this is F or a quadratic extension of F (depending in whether or not D is a square in F), p(x) remains irreducible in it. Consequently, the Galois group of p(x) over F(√D) is the cyclic group C_{3}. Suppose that p(x) = 0 can be solved by real radicals. Then p(x) can be split by a tower of cyclic extensions
$$F\sub F(\sqrt{D})\sub F(\sqrt{D}, \sqrt[p_1]{\alpha_1}) \sub\cdots \sub K\sub K(\sqrt[3]{\alpha})$$

At the final step of the tower, p(x) is irreducible in the penultimate field K, but splits in K(^{3}√α) for some α. But this is a cyclic field extension, and so must contain a conjugate of ^{3}√α and therefore a primitive 3rd root of unity.

However, there are no primitive 3rd roots of unity in a real closed field, since the primitive 3rd roots of unity are the roots of the quadratic equation $x^2+x+1=0$ which has a negative discriminant.

== Solution in non-real radicals ==
=== Cardano's solution ===
The equation ax^{3} + bx^{2} + cx + d = 0 can be depressed to a monic trinomial by dividing by $a$ and substituting x = t − b/3a (the Tschirnhaus transformation), giving the equation t^{3} + pt + q = 0 where

$$p=\frac{3ac-b^2}{3a^2}$$

$$q=\frac{2b^3-9abc+27a^2d}{27a^3}.$$

Then regardless of the number of real roots, by Cardano's solution the three roots are given by

$$t_k = \omega_k \sqrt[3]{-{q\over 2}+ \sqrt{{q^{2}\over 4}+{p^{3}\over 27}}} + \omega_k^2  \sqrt[3]{-{q\over 2}- \sqrt{{q^{2}\over 4}+{p^{3}\over 27}}}$$

where $\omega_k$ (k=1, 2, 3) is a cube root of 1 ($\omega_1 = 1$, $\omega_2 = -\frac{1}{2} + \frac{\sqrt{3}}{2}i$, and $\omega_3 = -\frac{1}{2} - \frac{\sqrt{3}}{2}i$, where i is the imaginary unit). Here if the radicands under the cube roots are non-real, the cube roots expressed by radicals are defined to be any pair of complex conjugate cube roots, while if they are real these cube roots are defined to be the real cube roots.

Casus irreducibilis occurs when none of the roots are rational and when all three roots are distinct and real; the case of three distinct real roots occurs if and only if q^{2}/4 + p^{3}/27 < 0, in which case Cardano's formula involves first taking the square root of a negative number, which is imaginary, and then taking the cube root of a complex number (the cube root cannot itself be placed in the form α + βi with specifically given expressions in real radicals for α and β, since doing so would require independently solving the original cubic). Even in the reducible case in which one of three real roots is rational and hence can be factored out by polynomial long division, Cardano's formula (unnecessarily in this case) expresses that root (and the others) in terms of non-real radicals.

=== Example ===
The cubic equation

$$2x^3-9x^2-6x+3=0$$

is irreducible, because if it could be factored there would be a linear factor giving a rational solution, while none of the possible roots given by the rational root test are actually roots. Since its discriminant is positive, it has three real roots, so it is an example of casus irreducibilis. These roots can be expressed as

$$t_k=\frac{3+\omega_k\sqrt[3]{39-26i}+\omega_k^2\sqrt[3]{39+26i}}{2}$$

for $k\in\left\{1, 2, 3\right\}$. The solutions are in radicals and involve the cube roots of complex conjugate numbers.

== Trigonometric solution in terms of real quantities ==
While casus irreducibilis cannot be solved in radicals in terms of real quantities, it can be solved trigonometrically in terms of real quantities. Specifically, the depressed monic cubic equation $t^3+pt+q=0$ is solved by

$$t_k=2\sqrt{-\frac{p}{3}}\cos\left[\frac{1}{3}\arccos\left(\frac{3q}{2p}\sqrt{\frac{-3}{p}}\right)-k\frac{2\pi}{3}\right] \quad \text{for} \quad k=0,1,2 \,.$$

These solutions are in terms of real quantities if and only if ${q^{2}\over 4}+{p^{3}\over 27} < 0$ — i.e., if and only if there are three real roots. The formula involves starting with an angle whose cosine is known, trisecting the angle by multiplying it by 1/3, and taking the cosine of the resulting angle and adjusting for scale.

Although cosine and its inverse function (arccosine) are transcendental functions, this solution is algebraic in the sense that $\cos\left[\arccos\left(x\right)/3\right]$ is an algebraic function, equivalent to angle trisection.

== Relation to angle trisection ==
The distinction between the reducible and irreducible cubic cases with three real roots is related to the issue of whether or not an angle is trisectible by the classical means of compass and unmarked straightedge. For any angle θ, one-third of this angle has a cosine that is one of the three solutions to

$$4x^3-3x-\cos(\theta)=0.$$

Likewise, θ/3 has a sine that is one of the three real solutions to

$$4y^3-3y+\sin(\theta)=0.$$

In either case, if the rational root test reveals a rational solution, x or y minus that root can be factored out of the polynomial on the left side, leaving a quadratic that can be solved for the remaining two roots in terms of a square root; then all of these roots are classically constructible since they are expressible in no higher than square roots, so in particular cos(θ/3) or sin(θ/3) is constructible and so is the associated angle θ/3. On the other hand, if the rational root test shows that there is no rational root, then casus irreducibilis applies, cos(θ/3) or sin(θ/3) is not constructible, the angle θ/3 is not constructible, and the angle θ is not classically trisectible.

As an example, while a 180° angle can be trisected into three 60° angles, a 60° angle cannot be trisected with only compass and straightedge. Using triple-angle formulae one can see that cos π/3 = 4x^{3} − 3x where x = cos(20°). Rearranging gives 8x^{3} − 6x − 1 = 0, which fails the rational root test as none of the rational numbers suggested by the theorem is actually a root. Therefore, the minimal polynomial of cos(20°) has degree 3, whereas the degree of the minimal polynomial of any constructible number must be a power of two.

Expressing cos(20°) in radicals results in

$$\cos\left(\frac{\pi}{9}\right)=\frac{\sqrt[3]{1-i\sqrt{3}}+\sqrt[3]{1+i\sqrt{3}}}{2\sqrt[3]{2}}$$

which involves taking the cube root of complex numbers. Note the similarity to e^{iπ/3} = (1+i√3)/2 and e^{−iπ/3} = (1−i√3)/2.

The connection between rational roots and trisectability can also be extended to some cases where the sine and cosine of the given angle is irrational. Consider as an example the case where the given angle θ is a vertex angle of a regular pentagon, a polygon that can be constructed classically. For this angle 5θ/3 is 180°, and standard trigonometric identities then give

$$\cos(\theta)+\cos(\theta/3) = 2\cos(\theta/3)\cos(2\theta/3)
=-2\cos(\theta/3)\cos(\theta)$$

thus

$$\cos(\theta/3) = -\cos(\theta)/(1+2\cos(\theta)).$$

The cosine of the trisected angle is rendered as a rational expression in terms of the cosine of the given angle, so the vertex angle of a regular pentagon can be trisected (mechanically, by simply drawing a diagonal).

== Generalization ==
Casus irreducibilis can be generalized to higher degree polynomials as follows. Let p ∈ F[x] be an irreducible polynomial which splits in a formally real extension R of F (i.e., p has only real roots). Assume that p has a root in $K\subseteq R$ which is an extension of F by radicals. Then the degree of p is a power of 2, and its splitting field is an iterated quadratic extension of F.

Thus for any irreducible polynomial whose degree is not a power of 2 and which has all roots real, no root can be expressed purely in terms of real radicals, i.e. it is a casus irreducibilis in the (16th century) sense of this article. Moreover, if the polynomial degree is a power of 2 and the roots are all real, then if there is a root that can be expressed in real radicals it can be expressed in terms of square roots and no higher-degree roots, as can the other roots, and so the roots are classically constructible.

Casus irreducibilis for quintic polynomials is discussed by Dummit.

=== Relation to angle pentasection (quintisection) and higher ===
The distinction between the reducible and irreducible quintic cases with five real roots is related to the issue of whether or not an angle with rational cosine or rational sine is pentasectible (able to be split into five equal parts) by the classical means of compass and unmarked straightedge. For any angle θ, one-fifth of this angle has a cosine that is one of the five real roots of the equation

$$16x^5-20x^3+5x-\cos(\theta)=0.$$

Likewise, θ/5 has a sine that is one of the five real roots of the equation

$$16y^5-20y^3+5y-\sin(\theta)=0.$$

In either case, if the rational root test yields a rational root x_{1}, then the quintic is reducible since it can be written as a factor (x—x_{1}) times a quartic polynomial. But if the test shows that there is no rational root, then the polynomial may be irreducible, in which case casus irreducibilis applies, cos(θ/5) and sin(θ/5) are not constructible, the angle θ/5 is not constructible, and the angle θ is not classically pentasectible. An example of this is when one attempts to construct a 25-gon (icosipentagon) with compass and straightedge. While a pentagon is relatively easy to construct, a 25-gon requires an angle pentasector as the minimal polynomial for cos(14.4°) has degree 10:

$$\begin{align}
\cos\left(\frac{2\pi}{5}\right) &= \frac{\sqrt{5}-1}{4} \\
16x^5-20x^3+5x+\frac{1-\sqrt{5}}{4} &= 0 \qquad\qquad x=\cos\left(\frac{2\pi}{25}\right) \\
4\left(16x^5-20x^3+5x+\frac{1-\sqrt{5}}{4}\right)\left(16x^5-20x^3+5x+\frac{1+\sqrt{5}}{4}\right) &= 0 \\
4\left(16x^5-20x^3+5x\right)^2+2\left(16x^5-20x^3+5x\right)-1 &= 0 \\
1024x^{10}-2560x^8+2240 x^6+32x^5-800 x^4-40x^3+100x^2+10x-1 &= 0.
\end{align}$$

Thus,

$$\begin{align}
e^{2\pi i/5} &= \frac{-1+\sqrt{5}}{4}+\frac{\sqrt{10+2\sqrt{5}}}{4}i \\
e^{-2\pi i/5} &= \frac{-1+\sqrt{5}}{4}-\frac{\sqrt{10+2\sqrt{5}}}{4}i \\
\cos\left(\frac{2\pi}{25}\right) &= \frac{\sqrt[5]{-1+\sqrt{5}-i\sqrt{10+2\sqrt{5}}}+\sqrt[5]{-1+\sqrt{5}+i\sqrt{10+2\sqrt{5}}}}{2\sqrt[5]{4}}.
\end{align}$$
