= George Jerrard =

British mathematician

George Birch Jerrard (25 November 1804 – 23 November 1863) was a British mathematician.

He studied at Trinity College, Dublin from 1821 to 1827. His main work was on the theory of equations, where he was reluctant to accept the validity of the work of Niels Henrik Abel on the insolubility of the quintic equation by radicals. He found a way of using Tschirnhaus transformations to eliminate three of the terms in an equation, which generalised work of Erland Bring (1736–1798), and is now called Bring–Jerrard normal form.

== Works ==
- An essay on the resolution of equations, part 1, London 1858, (online).
