= Solvable =

In mathematics, solvable may refer to:

- Solvable group, a group that can be constructed by compositions of abelian groups, or equivalently a group whose derived series reaches the trivial group in finitely many steps
- Solvable extension, a field extension whose Galois group is a solvable group
- Solvable equation, a polynomial equation whose Galois group is solvable, or equivalently, one whose solutions may be expressed by nested radicals
- Solvable Lie algebra, a Lie algebra whose derived series reaches the zero algebra in finitely many steps
- Solvable problem, a computational problem that can be solved by a Turing machine
- Exactly solvable model in statistical mechanics, a system whose solution can be expressed in closed form, or alternatively, another name for completely integrable systems

== See also ==
- solved game
- solubility
