= Polynomial transformation =

Transformation of a polynomial induced by a transformation of its roots

In mathematics, a polynomial transformation consists of computing the polynomial whose roots are a given function of the roots of a polynomial. Polynomial transformations such as Tschirnhaus transformations are often used to simplify the solution of algebraic equations.

== Simple examples ==
=== Translating the roots ===
Let

$$P(x) = a_0x^n + a_1 x^{n-1} + \cdots + a_{n}$$

be a polynomial, and

$$\alpha_1, \ldots, \alpha_n$$

be its complex roots (not necessarily distinct).

For any constant c, the polynomial whose roots are

$$\alpha_1+c, \ldots, \alpha_n+c$$

is

$$Q(y) = P(y-c)= a_0(y-c)^n + a_1 (y-c)^{n-1} + \cdots + a_{n}.$$

If the coefficients of P are integers and the constant $c=\frac{p}{q}$ is a rational number, the coefficients of Q may be not integers, but the polynomial c^{n} Q has integer coefficients and has the same roots as Q.

A special case is when $c=\frac{a_1}{na_0}.$ The resulting polynomial Q does not have any term in y^{n − 1}.

=== Reciprocals of the roots ===
Let

$$P(x) = a_0x^n + a_1 x^{n-1} + \cdots + a_{n}$$

be a polynomial. The polynomial whose roots are the reciprocals of the roots of P is its reciprocal polynomial

$$Q(y)= y^nP\left(\frac{1}{y}\right)= a_ny^n + a_{n-1} y^{n-1} + \cdots + a_{0}.$$

=== Scaling the roots ===
Let

$$P(x) = a_0x^n + a_1 x^{n-1} + \cdots + a_{n}$$

be a polynomial, and c be a non-zero constant. A polynomial whose roots are the product by c of the roots of P is

$$Q(y)=c^nP\left(\frac{y}{c} \right) = a_0y^n + a_1 cy^{n-1} + \cdots + a_{n}c^n.$$

The factor c^{n} appears here because, if c and the coefficients of P are integers or belong to some integral domain, the same is true for the coefficients of Q.

In the special case where $c=a_0$, all coefficients of Q are multiples of c, and $\frac{Q}{c}$ is a monic polynomial, whose coefficients belong to any integral domain containing c and the coefficients of P. This polynomial transformation is often used to reduce questions on algebraic numbers to questions on algebraic integers.

Combining this with a translation of the roots by $\frac{a_1}{na_0}$, allows to reduce any question on the roots of a polynomial, such as root-finding, to a similar question on a simpler polynomial, which is monic and does not have a term of degree n − 1. For examples of this, see Cubic function § Reduction to a depressed cubic or Quartic function § Converting to a depressed quartic.

== Transformation by a rational function ==
All preceding examples are polynomial transformations by a rational function, also called Tschirnhaus transformations. Let

$$f(x)=\frac{g(x)}{h(x)}$$

be a rational function, where g and h are coprime polynomials. The polynomial transformation of a polynomial P by f is the polynomial Q (defined up to the product by a non-zero constant) whose roots are the images by f of the roots of P.

Such a polynomial transformation may be computed as a resultant. In fact, the roots of the desired polynomial Q are exactly the complex numbers y such that there is a complex number x such that one has simultaneously (if the coefficients of P, g and h are not real or complex numbers, "complex number" has to be replaced by "element of an algebraically closed field containing the coefficients of the input polynomials")

$$\begin{align}
P(x)&=0\\
y\,h(x)-g(x)&=0\,.
\end{align}$$

This is exactly the defining property of the resultant

$$\operatorname{Res}_x(y\,h(x)-g(x),P(x)).$$

This is generally difficult to compute by hand. However, as most computer algebra systems have a built-in function to compute resultants, it is straightforward to compute it with a computer.

=== Properties ===
If the polynomial P is irreducible, then either the resulting polynomial Q is irreducible, or it is a power of an irreducible polynomial. Let $\alpha$ be a root of P and consider L, the field extension generated by $\alpha$. The former case means that $f(\alpha)$ is a primitive element of L, which has Q as minimal polynomial. In the latter case, $f(\alpha)$ belongs to a subfield of L and its minimal polynomial is the irreducible polynomial that has Q as power.

== Transformation for equation-solving ==
Polynomial transformations have been applied to the simplification of polynomial equations for solution, where possible, by radicals. Descartes introduced the transformation of a polynomial of degree d which eliminates the term of degree d − 1 by a translation of the roots. Such a polynomial is termed depressed. This already suffices to solve the quadratic by square roots. In the case of the cubic, Tschirnhaus transformations replace the variable by a quadratic function, thereby making it possible to eliminate two terms, and so can be used to eliminate the linear term in a depressed cubic to achieve the solution of the cubic by a combination of square and cube roots. The Bring–Jerrard transformation, which is quartic in the variable, brings a quintic into Bring-Jerrard normal form with terms of degree 5,1, and 0.

== See also ==
- Tschirnhaus transformation
- Adamchik transformation
