= Carl Johannes Thomae =

German mathematician

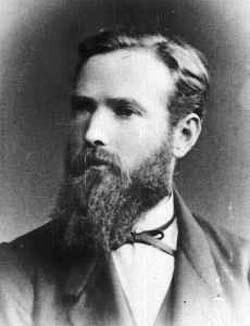
- Born: 11 December 1840; Laucha an der Unstrut, Kingdom of Prussia
- Died: 1 April 1921 (aged 80); Jena, Weimar Republic
- Education: University of Göttingen
- Known for: Thomae's function, Thomae's formula
- Scientific career
- Fields: Complex analysis
- Workplaces: University of Jena
- Doctoral advisor: Ernst Schering
- Doctoral students: Heinrich Liebmann

Carl Johannes Thomae (sometimes called Johannes Thomae, Karl Johannes Thomae, or Johannes Karl Thomae; 11 December 1840 – 1 April 1921) was a German mathematician.

== Biography ==
Thomae, son of Karl August Thomae (head master) and Emilie Gutsmuths, grew up in Laucha an der Unstrut and in 1864 attained a doctorate under Ernst Schering at the University of Göttingen. In 1866 Thomae attained the habilitation qualification at the University of Göttingen and one year later also at the University of Halle. In the year 1874, Thomae married Anna Uhde in Balgstädt in the proximity of his native city Laucha an der Unstrut. Their son Walter Thomae was born one year later on 5 November 1875, but Thomae's wife died 5 days after giving birth.

In 1879 Thomae became ordentliche professor at the University of Jena. In 1892 he married his second wife Sophie Pröpper in Jena. One year later was born Susanne Thomae. In 1914 Thomae, at that time dean of the philosophical faculty at the University of Jena, retired. In 1921 he died in Jena after a short illness.

Carl Johannes Thomae's research was concerned with function theory and with what German-speaking mathematicians often call "Epsilontik", the precise development of analysis, differential geometry, and topology using epsilon-neighborhoods in the style of Weierstrass. The Thomae function, the Thomae transformation formula (aka, Thomae's transformation and Thomae's theorem), the Thomae formula for hyperelliptic curves, and the Sears–Thomae transformation formula are named after him. He called himself Riemann's student, although he never attended a lecture by Riemann.

== Works ==
- Thomae, Carl Johannes (1870), "Beitrag zur Bestimmung von θ(0,0,...0) durch die Klassenmoduln algebraischer Funktionen", Journal für die reine und angewandte Mathematik, 71: 201–222
- Elementare Theorie der analytischen Funktionen einer komplexen Veränderlichen. Nebert, Halle (Saale) 1880.
