= Erland Samuel Bring =

Swedish mathematician

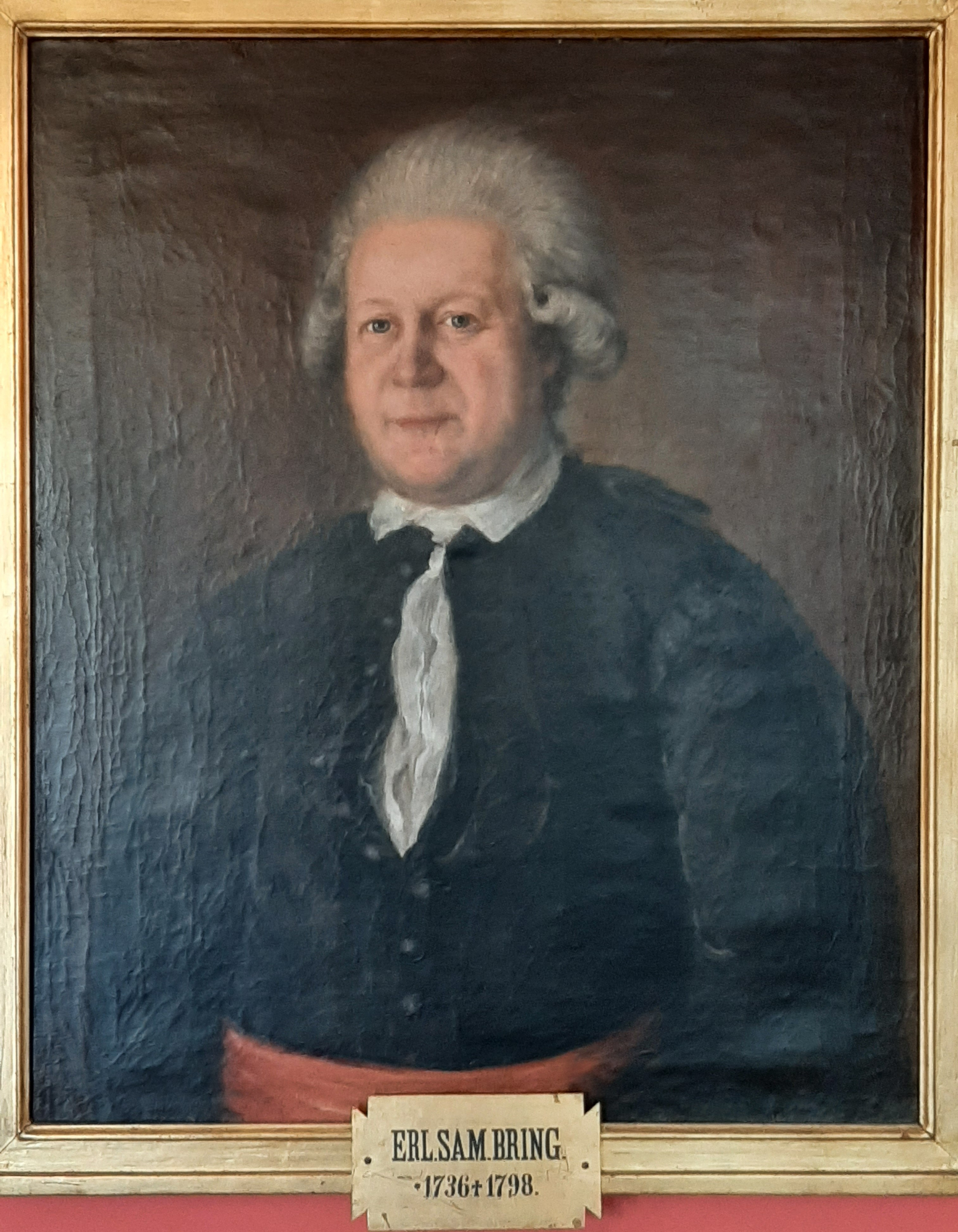
- Born: August 19, 1736
- Died: May 20, 1798
- Education: Lund University
- Known for: Bring's curve Bring radical
- Scientific career
- Fields: Mathematics

Erland Samuel Bring (19 August 1736 – 20 May 1798) was a Swedish mathematician.

Bring studied at Lund University between 1750 and 1757. In 1762 he obtained a position of a reader in history and was promoted to professor in 1779. At Lund he wrote eight volumes of mathematical work in the fields of algebra, geometry, analysis and astronomy, including Meletemata quaedam mathematica circa transformationem aequationum algebraicarum (1786). This work describes Bring's contribution to the algebraic solution of equations.

Bring had developed an important transformation to simplify a quintic equation to the form $x^5 + px + q = 0$ (see Bring radical). In 1832–35 the same transformation was independently derived by George Jerrard. However, whereas Jerrard knew from the past work by Paolo Ruffini and Niels Henrik Abel that a general quintic equation can not be solved, this fact was not known to Bring, putting him in a disadvantage.

Bring's curve is named after him.
