= Tschirnhaus transformation =

Mathematical term; type of polynomial transformation

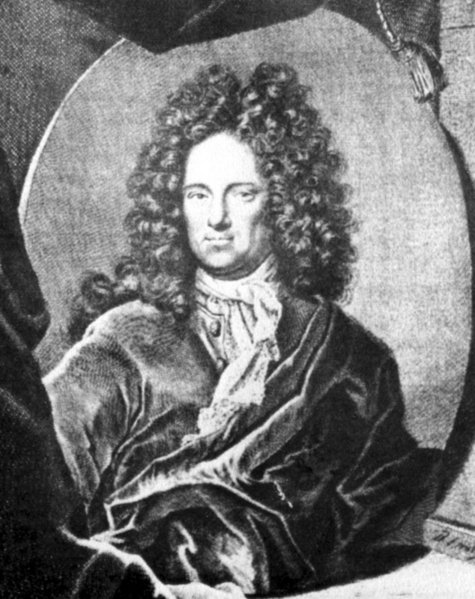
Ehrenfried Walther von Tschirnhaus

In mathematics, a Tschirnhaus transformation, also known as Tschirnhausen transformation, is a type of mapping on polynomials developed by Ehrenfried Walther von Tschirnhaus in 1683.

Simply, it is a method for transforming a polynomial equation of degree $n\ge2$ with some nonzero intermediate coefficients, $a_1, ..., a_{n-1}$, such that some or all of the transformed intermediate coefficients, $a'_1, ..., a'_{n-1}$, are exactly zero.

For example, finding a substitution
$$y(x)=k_1x^2 + k_2x+k_3$$
for a cubic equation of degree $n=3$,
$$f(x) = x^3+a_2x^2+a_1x+a_0$$
such that substituting $x=x(y)$ yields a new equation
$$f'(y)=y^3+a'_2y^2+a'_1y+a'_0$$
such that $a'_1=0$, $a'_2=0$, or both.

More generally, it may be defined conveniently by means of field theory, as the transformation on minimal polynomials implied by a different choice of primitive element. This is the most general transformation of an irreducible polynomial that takes a root to some rational function applied to that root.

== Definition ==
For a generic $n^{th}$ degree reducible monic polynomial equation $f(x)=0$ of the form $f(x) = g(x) / h(x)$, where $g(x)$ and $h(x)$ are polynomials and $h(x)$ does not vanish at $f(x) = 0$,
$$f(x) = x^n+a_1x^{n-1}+a_2x^{n-2}+...+a_{n-1}x+a_n=0$$
the Tschirnhaus transformation is the function:
$$y=k_1x^{n-1} + k_2x^{n-2}+...+k_{n-1}x+k_n$$
Such that the new equation in $y$, $f'(y)$, has certain special properties, most commonly such that some coefficients, $a'_1,...,a'_{n-1}$, are identically zero.

== Example: Tschirnhaus' method for cubic equations ==
In Tschirnhaus' 1683 paper, he found the roots of the polynomial
$$f(x)=x^3-px^2+qx-r$$
using the change of variables
$$y(x;a)=x-a$$
and its inverse
$$x(y;a)=y+a.$$
Replacing $x$ by $y+a$ in $f$, and expanding the powers of $y+a$ in the resulting formula, yields the transformed polynomial
$$\begin{align}
f'(y;a)&=y^3+(3a-p)y^2+(3a^2-2pa+q) y+(a^3-pa^2+qa-r)\\
&=y^3+a'_1y^2+a'_2y+a'_3
\end{align}$$
with the coefficients
$$\begin{align} a'_1&=3a-p \\ a'_2&=3a^2-2pa+q \\ a'_3&=a^3-pa^2+qa-r. \end{align}$$
The quadratic term in $f'$ may be eliminated by setting $a'_1=0$, and solving for $a'_1=3a-p=0$ determines the parameter $a$ as $a=p/3$. Thus, the Tschirnhaus transformation
$$y=x-\frac{p}{3},$$
may be substituted into $f'(y;a)$ to yield a polynomial of the form
$$f'(y)=y^3-q'y-r'.$$
The roots of the original polynomial $f$ may be obtained from the roots of this transformed polynomial $f'$ by the same transformation. Tschirnhaus went on to describe how a Tschirnhaus transformation of the form
$$x^2=bx+y+a$$
may be used to eliminate two coefficients in a similar way.

== Generalization ==
In detail, let $K$ be a field, and $P(t)$ a polynomial over $K$. If $P$ is irreducible, then the quotient ring of the polynomial ring $K[t]$ by the principal ideal generated by $P$,

$$K[t]/(P(t)) = L$$,

is a field extension of $K$. We have

$$L = K(\alpha)$$

where $\alpha$ is $t$ modulo $(P)$. That is, any element of $L$ is a polynomial in $\alpha$, which is thus a primitive element of $L$. There will be other choices $\beta$ of primitive element in $L$: for any such choice of $\beta$ we will have by definition:

$$\beta = F(\alpha), \alpha = G(\beta)$$,

with polynomials $F$ and $G$ over $K$. Now if $Q$ is the minimal polynomial for $\beta$ over $K$, we can call $Q$ a Tschirnhaus transformation of $P$.

Therefore the set of all Tschirnhaus transformations of an irreducible polynomial is to be described as running over all ways of changing $P$, but leaving $L$ the same. This concept is used in reducing quintics to Bring–Jerrard form, for example. There is a connection with Galois theory, when $L$ is a Galois extension of $K$. The Galois group may then be considered as all the Tschirnhaus transformations of $P$ to itself.

== History ==
In 1683, Ehrenfried Walther von Tschirnhaus published a method for rewriting a polynomial of degree $n>2$ such that the $x^{n-1}$ and $x^{n-2}$ terms have zero coefficients. In his paper, Tschirnhaus referenced a method by René Descartes to reduce a quadratic polynomial $(n=2)$ such that the $x$ term has zero coefficient.

In 1786, this work was expanded by Erland Samuel Bring who showed that any generic quintic polynomial could be similarly reduced.

In 1834, George Jerrard further expanded Tschirnhaus' work by showing a Tschirnhaus transformation may be used to eliminate the $x^{n-1}$, $x^{n-2}$, and $x^{n-3}$ for a general polynomial of degree $n>3$.

== See also ==
- Completing the square
- Polynomial transformations
- Monic polynomial
- Reducible polynomial
- Quintic function
- Galois theory
- Abel–Ruffini theorem
- Principal equation form
