= Nested radical =

Mathematical expression with outer and inner radicals

In algebra, a nested radical is a radical expression (one containing a square root sign, cube root sign, etc.) that contains (nests) another radical expression. Examples include

$$\sqrt{5-2\sqrt{5}\ },$$

which arises in discussing the regular pentagon, and more complicated ones such as

$$\sqrt[3]{2+\sqrt{3}+\sqrt[3]{4}\ }.$$

== Denesting ==
Some nested radicals can be rewritten in a form that is not nested. For example,

$$\sqrt{3+2\sqrt{2}} = 1+\sqrt{2}\,,$$

$\sqrt2+\sqrt{5-2\sqrt{6}} = \sqrt{3},\quad$

$$\sqrt[3]{\sqrt[3]{2} - 1} = \frac{1 - \sqrt[3]{2} + \sqrt[3]{4}}{\sqrt[3]{9}} \,.$$

Another simple example,

$$\sqrt[3]{\sqrt{2}} = \sqrt[6]{2}$$

Rewriting a nested radical in this way is called denesting. This is not always possible, and, even when possible, it is often difficult.

== Two nested square roots ==
In the case of two nested square roots, the following theorem completely solves the problem of denesting. In this section the use of the radical sign $\textstyle\sqrt{\;^\;}$ denotes, as usual, the positive square root of the radicand, which is supposed to be a positive real number,

One has two nested square roots with an expression of the form
$$\sqrt{\frac{\alpha + \beta\sqrt r}{\gamma + \delta\sqrt r}},$$
where all variables denote rational numbers. By rationalizing the fraction, one gets an expression of the form
$$\sqrt{a\pm b\sqrt r},$$
where $a,b,r$ are rational numbers and $b>0$. By putting $c=rb^2$, the problem is reduced to denest an expression of the form
$$\sqrt{a\pm\sqrt c}.$$

Theorem—It is possible to denest the expression $\sqrt{a\pm\sqrt c}$ where $a$ and $c$ are rational numbers if and only if $a>0$ and $a^2-c$ is the square of a positive rational number $d$. In this case one has
$$\begin{align}
\sqrt{a+\sqrt{c}}&=\sqrt{\frac{a+d}2}+\sqrt{\frac{a-d}2},\\[6pt]
\sqrt{a-\sqrt{c}}&=\sqrt{\frac{a+d}2}-\sqrt{\frac{a-d}2},
\end{align}$$

The theorem will be proved in two separate steps. Firstly, one has a denested formula of the form $\sqrt x\pm \sqrt y$ if and only if $a^2-c=d^2$. This will be done with elementary algebraic computation. The second step consists to prove that more complicated denested formulas, such as $t+ \sqrt x \pm \sqrt y +z\sqrt x\sqrt y$, can always be reduced to the form given in the theorem. This involves basic Galois theory.

Proof that the given denesting formula is correct: If $a>0$ and $a^2-c=d^2$, all radicands are positive in the given formulas. This is almost immediate for the left-hand sides. For the right-hand sides, this results from the positiveness of the sum and the product of the two radicands that are respectively $a$ and $c/4$. Then, since two positive numbes are equal if and only if their squares are equal, it suffices to square everything and apply the binomial formula.

Proof that, if denesting is possible into a sum or difference of square roots, then $a>0$ and $a^2-c=d^2$. By squaring, the equation
$$\sqrt{a\pm\sqrt{c}} = \sqrt{x}\pm\sqrt{y}$$
implies
$$a\pm\sqrt{c}=x+y\pm 2\sqrt{xy}.$$
This implies that $\sqrt{xy}$ is an element of the field $\Q(\sqrt c)$, and can thus be uniquely written $\alpha+\beta\sqrt c$, with $\alpha$ and $\beta$ rational numbers. One has $\beta\ne 0$ since, otherwise one would have an irrational number equal to a rational number. One has
$$xy=(\alpha+\beta\sqrt c)^2=\alpha^2+c\beta^2+2\alpha\beta\sqrt c.$$
As $xy$ is a rational number and $\beta\ne 0$, one has $\alpha=0$. It results that $xy=\beta^2c$ and
$$a+\sqrt{c}=x+y\pm 2\beta \sqrt c.$$
Thus $x+y=a$, $\beta=\tfrac 12$, and $xy=\tfrac c4$. This implies by Vieta's formulas that $x$ and $y$ are the two roots ot the equation
$$X^2-aX+\frac c4.$$
As these roots must be rational and positive, this implies that $a>0$ and $a^2-c$ is the square of a rational number. Then, the quadratic formula provides the solution as given in the theorem.

Other forms of denesting:

A denesting of the form
$$\sqrt{a+\sqrt{c}} = \alpha\sqrt{r}+\beta\sqrt{s}$$
can be reduced to the above form: setting $x=r\alpha^2$ and $y=s\beta^2$, one gets
$$\sqrt{a+\sqrt{c}} = \pm\sqrt{x}\pm\sqrt{y}.$$
Since the left member of the equality is positive, at least one of the "$\pm$" must be positive, and one gets the above form after exchanging, if needed, $x$ and $y$.

If $\sqrt{a\pm\sqrt{c} } \in \Q(\sqrt c),$ there are rational numbers $\alpha$ and $\beta$ such that
$$\sqrt{a\pm \sqrt{c}} = \alpha + \beta \sqrt c=\pm \sqrt{\alpha^2}\pm \sqrt{\beta^2 c}.$$
So, the theorem applies to test whether an element of $\Q(\sqrt c)$ has a square root in $\Q(\sqrt c)$, and, if it has one, to compute it.

A general denesting formula would be an expression of $\sqrt{a\pm\sqrt{c}}$ as an element of a field $K=\Q(\sqrt {r_1},\ldots \sqrt {r_k})$, where $r_1, \ldots, r_k$ are rational numbers. One may suppose that the $r_i$ are distinct prime numbers, by extending $K$ with the square roots of the prime numbers that appear as factors of the numerator or the denominator of some $r_i$, and then removing the original $\sqrt{r_i}$, since they can be expressed as product and quotients of the new square roots. If the $r_i$ are distinct prime numbers, $K$ is a Galois extension of $\Q$ with $(\Z/2\Z)^k$ as Galois group. An element of this Galois groupe is a $k$-tuple of 0 and 1, and the corresponding automorphism consists to change the signs of the $\sqrt{r_i}$ such the $i$th element of the tuple is 1.

Excluding the already considered case $\sqrt{a\pm\sqrt{c} } \in \Q(\sqrt c),$ the field $\Q\left(\sqrt{a\pm\sqrt{c} }\right)$ is a subfield of $K$ of degree four over of $\Q$. It follows that it is a galois extension of $\Q$, with the Klein four-group as its Galois group. The automorphisms in this Galois group are the identity, two involutions $\sigma_1$ and $\sigma_2$ whose square are the identity, and their product $\sigma_1\sigma_2$. The elements of $\Q\left(\sqrt{a\pm\sqrt{c} }\right)$ that are fixed by $\sigma_1$ for a quadratic extension of $\Q$, which is thus of the form $\Q(x)$, where $x\in \Q$. Similarly, the elements fixed b $\sigma_2$ generate a field $\Q(y)$, and one has $\Q\left(\sqrt{a\pm\sqrt{c} }\right)=\Q(\sqrt x,\sqrt y)$.

This shows that when denesting is possible, it is possible with at most two radicals.

As for every element of $\Q(\sqrt x,\sqrt y)$, one may write uniquely
$$\sqrt{a\pm\sqrt{c} }=\alpha +\beta\sqrt x +\gamma \sqrt y+\delta\sqrt x \sqrt y,$$
with $\alpha, \beta, \gamma,\delta\in \Q$. There exists an automorphism that changes the sign of the left member. It must change the signs of all nonzero terms of the right member|. It follows that $\alpha$ and at least one of $\beta, \gamma,\delta$ must be zero. Indeed, if $\beta\ne 0$ and $\gamma\ne 0$, one must have $\delta = 0$, because the change of sign of the two first radicals implies that the sign of their product is not changed.

So, setting $z=xy$, and, if needed, permuting and renaming the variables, we are reduced to a denesting into a sum or difference of two square roots that has already been considered.

== Some identities of Ramanujan ==
Srinivasa Ramanujan demonstrated a number of curious identities involving nested radicals. Among them are the following:

$$\sqrt[4]{\frac{3 + 2 \sqrt[4]{5}}{3 - 2 \sqrt[4]{5}}} = \frac{ \sqrt[4]{5} + 1}{\sqrt[4]{5} - 1}=\tfrac12\left(3+\sqrt[4]5+\sqrt5+\sqrt[4]{125}\right),$$

$$\sqrt{ \sqrt[3]{28} - \sqrt[3]{27}} = \tfrac13\left(\sqrt[3]{98} - \sqrt[3]{28} -1\right),$$

$$\sqrt[3]{ \sqrt[5]{\frac{32}{5}} - \sqrt[5]{\frac{27}{5}} } = \sqrt[5]{\frac{1}{25}} + \sqrt[5]{\frac{3}{25}} - \sqrt[5]{\frac{9}{25}},$$

and

$\sqrt[3]{\ \sqrt[3]{2}\ - 1}= \sqrt[3]{\frac{1}{9}} - \sqrt[3]{\frac{2}{9}} + \sqrt[3]{\frac{4}{9}}.\quad$

== Landau's algorithm ==
In 1989 Susan Landau introduced the first algorithm for deciding which nested radicals can be denested and denesting them when possible. Earlier algorithms worked in some cases but not others. Landau's algorithm is based on field theory, Galois theory, and polynomial factorization over algebraic field extensions. It runs in exponential time with respect to the depth of nested radicals.

== In trigonometry ==
In trigonometry, the sines and cosines of many angles can be expressed in terms of nested radicals. For example,
$$\sin\frac{\pi}{60}=\sin 3^\circ=\frac{1}{16} \left[2(1-\sqrt3)\sqrt{5+\sqrt5}+\sqrt2(\sqrt5-1)(\sqrt3+1)\right]$$

and
$$\sin\frac{\pi}{24}=\sin 7.5^\circ=\frac{1}{2} \sqrt{2-\sqrt{2+\sqrt3}} = \frac{1}{2} \sqrt{2 - \frac{1 + \sqrt3}{\sqrt2}} .$$
The last equality results directly from the results of § Two nested square roots.

== In the solution of the cubic equation ==
Nested radicals appear in the algebraic solution of the cubic equation. Any cubic equation can be written in simplified form without a quadratic term, as

$$x^3+px+q=0,$$

whose general solution for one of the roots is
$$x=\sqrt[3]{-{q\over 2}+ \sqrt{{q^2\over 4}+{p^3 \over 27}}} +\sqrt[3]{-{q\over 2}- \sqrt{{q^2\over 4}+{p^3\over 27}}}.$$

In the case in which the cubic has only one real root, the real root is given by this expression with the radicands of the cube roots being real and with the cube roots being the real cube roots. In the case of three real roots, the square root expression is an imaginary number; here any real root is expressed by defining the first cube root to be any specific complex cube root of the complex radicand, and by defining the second cube root to be the complex conjugate of the first one. The nested radicals in this solution cannot in general be simplified unless the cubic equation has at least one rational solution. Indeed, if the cubic has three irrational but real solutions, we have the casus irreducibilis, in which all three real solutions are written in terms of cube roots of complex numbers. On the other hand, consider the equation

$$x^3-7x+6=0,$$

which has the rational solutions 1, 2, and −3. The general solution formula given above gives the solutions
$$x=\sqrt[3]{-3+\frac{10i\sqrt{3}}{9}} + \sqrt[3]{-3-\frac{10i\sqrt{3}}{9}} .$$

For any given choice of cube root and its conjugate, this contains nested radicals involving complex numbers, yet it is reducible (even though not obviously so) to one of the solutions 1, 2, or −3.

== Infinitely nested radicals ==
=== Square roots ===
Under certain conditions infinitely nested square roots such as
$$x= \sqrt{2+\sqrt{2+\sqrt{2+\sqrt{2+\cdots}}}}$$

represent rational numbers. This rational number can be found by realizing that x also appears under the radical sign, which gives the equation

$$x = \sqrt{2+x}.$$

If we solve this equation, we find that x = 2 (the second solution x = −1 doesn't apply, under the convention that the positive square root is meant). This approach can also be used to show that generally, if n > 0, then
$$\sqrt{n+\sqrt{n+\sqrt{n+\sqrt{n+\cdots}}}} = \tfrac{1}{2}\left(1 + \sqrt {1+4n}\right)$$

and is the positive root of the equation x^{2} − x − n = 0. For n = 1, this root is the golden ratio φ, approximately equal to 1.618. The same procedure also works to obtain, if n > 0,
$$\sqrt{n-\sqrt{n-\sqrt{n-\sqrt{n-\cdots}}}} = \tfrac12\left(-1 + \sqrt {1+4n}\right),$$
which is the positive root of the equation x^{2} + x − n = 0.

==== Nested square roots of 2 ====
The nested square roots of 2 are a special case of the wide class of infinitely nested radicals. There are many known results that bind them to sines and cosines. For example, it has been shown that nested square roots of 2 as
$$R(b_k, \ldots, b_1)=\frac{b_k}{2} \sqrt{2+b_{k-1} \sqrt{2+b_{k-2} \sqrt{2+\cdots+b_2 \sqrt{2+x}}}}$$

where $x=2 \sin(\pi b_1/4)$ with $b_1$ in [−2,2] and $b_i\in \{-1,0,1\}$ for $i \neq 1$, are such that $R(b_k, \ldots, b_1)=\cos \theta$ for
$$\theta=\left(\frac{1}{2}-\frac{b_k}{4}-\frac{b_k b_{k-1}}{8}-\frac{b_k b_{k-1} b_{k-2}}{16}-\cdots-\frac{b_k b_{k-1} \cdots b_1}{2^{k+1}}\right) \pi .$$

This result allows to deduce for any $x \in [-2,2]$ the value of the following infinitely nested radicals consisting of k nested roots as
$$R_k(x)=\sqrt{2+\sqrt{2+\cdots+\sqrt{2+x}}}.$$

If $x \geq 2$, then
$$\begin{aligned}
R_k(x) &=\sqrt{2+\sqrt{2+\cdots+\sqrt{2+x}}} \\
&=\left(\frac{x+\sqrt{x^2-4}}{2}\right)^{1 / 2^k}+\left(\frac{x+\sqrt{x^2-4}}{2}\right)^{-1 / 2^k}
\end{aligned}$$

These results can be used to obtain some nested square roots representations of $\pi$ . Let us consider the term $R\left(b_{k}, \ldots, b_{1}\right)$ defined above. Then
$$\pi=\lim _{k \rightarrow \infty}\left[\frac{2^{k+1}}{2-b_{1}} R(\underbrace{1,-1,1,1, \ldots, 1,1, b_1}_{k \text { terms }})\right]$$

where $b_1\neq 2$.

==== Ramanujan's infinite radicals ====
Ramanujan posed the following problem to the Journal of Indian Mathematical Society:

$$? = \sqrt{1+2\sqrt{1+3 \sqrt{1+\cdots}}}.$$

This can be solved by noting a more general formulation:
$$? = \sqrt{ax+(n+a)^2 +x\sqrt{a(x+n)+(n+a)^2+(x+n) \sqrt{\mathrm{\cdots}}}}.$$

Setting this to F(x) and squaring both sides gives us
$$F(x)^2 = ax+(n+a)^2 +x\sqrt{a(x+n)+(n+a)^2+(x+n) \sqrt{\mathrm{\cdots}}},$$

which can be simplified to
$$F(x)^2 = ax + (n+a)^2 + x F(x+n) .$$

It can be shown that

$$F(x) = {x + n + a}$$

satisfies the equation for $F(x)$, so it can be hoped that it is the true solution. For a complete proof, we would need to show that this is indeed the solution to the equation for $F(x)$.

So, setting a = 0, n = 1, and x = 2, we have
$$3 = \sqrt{1+2\sqrt{1+3 \sqrt{1+\cdots}}}.$$
Ramanujan stated the following infinite radical denesting in his lost notebook:
$$\sqrt{5+\sqrt{5+\sqrt{5-\sqrt{5+\sqrt{5+\sqrt{5+\sqrt{5-\cdots}}}}}}}=\frac{2+\sqrt{5}+\sqrt{15-6\sqrt{5}}}{2}.$$
The repeating pattern of the signs is $(+,+,-,+).$

==== Viète's expression for π ====
Viète's formula for π, the ratio of a circle's circumference to its diameter, is
$$\frac{2}\pi=
\frac{\sqrt2}{2}\cdot
\frac{\sqrt{2+\sqrt2}}2\cdot
\frac{\sqrt{2+\sqrt{2+\sqrt2}}}2\cdots.$$

=== Cube roots ===
In certain cases, infinitely nested cube roots such as
$$x = \sqrt[3]{6+\sqrt[3]{6+\sqrt[3]{6+\sqrt[3]{6+\cdots}}}}$$
can represent rational numbers as well. Again, by realizing that the whole expression appears inside itself, we are left with the equation
$$x = \sqrt[3]{6+x}.$$

If we solve this equation, we find that x = 2. More generally, we find that
$$\sqrt[3]{n+\sqrt[3]{n+\sqrt[3]{n+\sqrt[3]{n+\cdots}}}}$$
is the positive real root of the equation x^{3} − x − n = 0 for all n > 0. For n = 1, this root is the plastic ratio ρ, approximately equal to 1.3247.

The same procedure also works to get

$$\sqrt[3]{n-\sqrt[3]{n-\sqrt[3]{n-\sqrt[3]{n-\cdots}}}}$$

as the real root of the equation x^{3} + x − n = 0 for all n > 1.

=== Herschfeld's convergence theorem ===
An infinitely nested radical $\sqrt{a_1 + \sqrt{a_2 + \dotsb}}$ (where all $a_i$ are nonnegative) converges if and only if there is some $M \in \mathbb R$ such that $M \geq a_n^{2^{-n}}$ for all $n$, or in other words $\sup a_n^{2^{-n}} <+\infty.$

==== Proof of "if" ====
We observe that
$$\sqrt{a_1 + \sqrt{a_2 + \dotsb}} \leq \sqrt{M^{2^1} + \sqrt{M^{2^2} + \cdots}} = M\sqrt{1 + \sqrt{1 + \dotsb}}<2M.$$
Moreover, the sequence $\left(\sqrt{a_1 + \sqrt{a_2 + \dotsc \sqrt{a_n}}}\right)$ is monotonically increasing. Therefore it converges, by the monotone convergence theorem.

==== Proof of "only if" ====
If the sequence $\left(\sqrt{a_1 + \sqrt{a_2 + \cdots \sqrt{a_n}}}\right)$ converges, then it is bounded.

However, $a_n^{2^{-n}}\le\sqrt{a_1 + \sqrt{a_2 + \cdots \sqrt{a_n}}}$, hence $\left(a_n^{2^{-n}}\right)$ is also bounded.

== See also ==
- Exponentiation
- Sum of radicals
