= Theory of equations =

Study of polynomial equations

In algebra, the theory of equations is the study of algebraic equations (also called "polynomial equations"), which are equations defined by a polynomial. The main problem of the theory of equations was to know when an algebraic equation has an algebraic solution. This problem was completely solved in 1830 by Évariste Galois, by introducing what is now called Galois theory.

Before Galois, there was no clear distinction between the "theory of equations" and "algebra". Since then algebra has been dramatically enlarged to include many new subareas, and the theory of algebraic equations receives much less attention. Thus, the term "theory of equations" is mainly used in the context of the history of mathematics, to avoid confusion between old and new meanings of "algebra".

== History ==
Until the end of the 19th century, "theory of equations" was almost synonymous with "algebra". For a long time, the main problem was to find the solutions of a single non-linear polynomial equation in a single unknown. The fact that a complex solution always exists is the fundamental theorem of algebra, which was proved only at the beginning of the 19th century and does not have a purely algebraic proof. Nevertheless, the main concern of the algebraists was to solve in terms of radicals, that is to express the solutions by a formula which is built with the four operations of arithmetics and with nth roots. This was done up to degree four during the 16th century. Scipione del Ferro and Niccolò Fontana Tartaglia discovered solutions for cubic equations. Gerolamo Cardano published them in his 1545 book Ars Magna, together with a solution for the quartic equations, discovered by his student Lodovico Ferrari. In 1572 Rafael Bombelli published his L'Algebra in which he showed how to deal with the imaginary quantities that could appear in Cardano's formula for solving cubic equations.

The case of higher degrees remained open until the 19th century, when Paolo Ruffini gave an incomplete proof in 1799 that some fifth degree equations cannot be solved in radicals followed by Niels Henrik Abel's complete proof in 1824 (now known as the Abel–Ruffini theorem). Évariste Galois later introduced a theory (presently called Galois theory) to decide which equations are solvable by radicals.

== Further problems ==
Other classical problems of the theory of equations are the following:

- Linear equations: this problem was solved during antiquity.
- Simultaneous linear equations: The general theoretical solution was provided by Gabriel Cramer in 1750. However devising efficient methods (algorithms) to solve these systems remains an active subject of research now called linear algebra.
- Finding the integer solutions of an equation or of a system of equations. These problems are now called Diophantine equations, which are considered a part of number theory (see also integer programming).
- Systems of polynomial equations: Because of their difficulty, these systems, with few exceptions, have been studied only since the second part of the 19th century. They have led to the development of algebraic geometry.

== See also ==
- Root-finding algorithm
- Properties of polynomial roots
- Quintic function
