= Ehrenfried Walther von Tschirnhaus =

German mathematician, physician, and philosopher (1651–1708)

Ehrenfried von Tschirnhaus
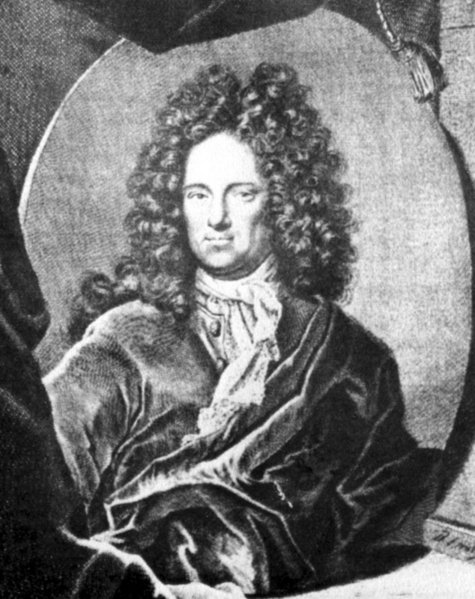
- Portrait by Martin Bernigeroth
- Born: Ehrenfried Walther von Tschirnhaus; 10 April 1651; Kieslingswalde, Electorate of Saxony, Holy Roman Empire (now Sławnikowice, Lower Silesian Voivodeship, Poland)
- Died: 11 October 1708 (aged 57); Dresden, Electorate of Saxony, Holy Roman Empire
- Education: Leiden University
- Scientific career
- Academic advisors: Arnold Geulincx; Franciscus Sylvius
- Notable students: Christian Wolff

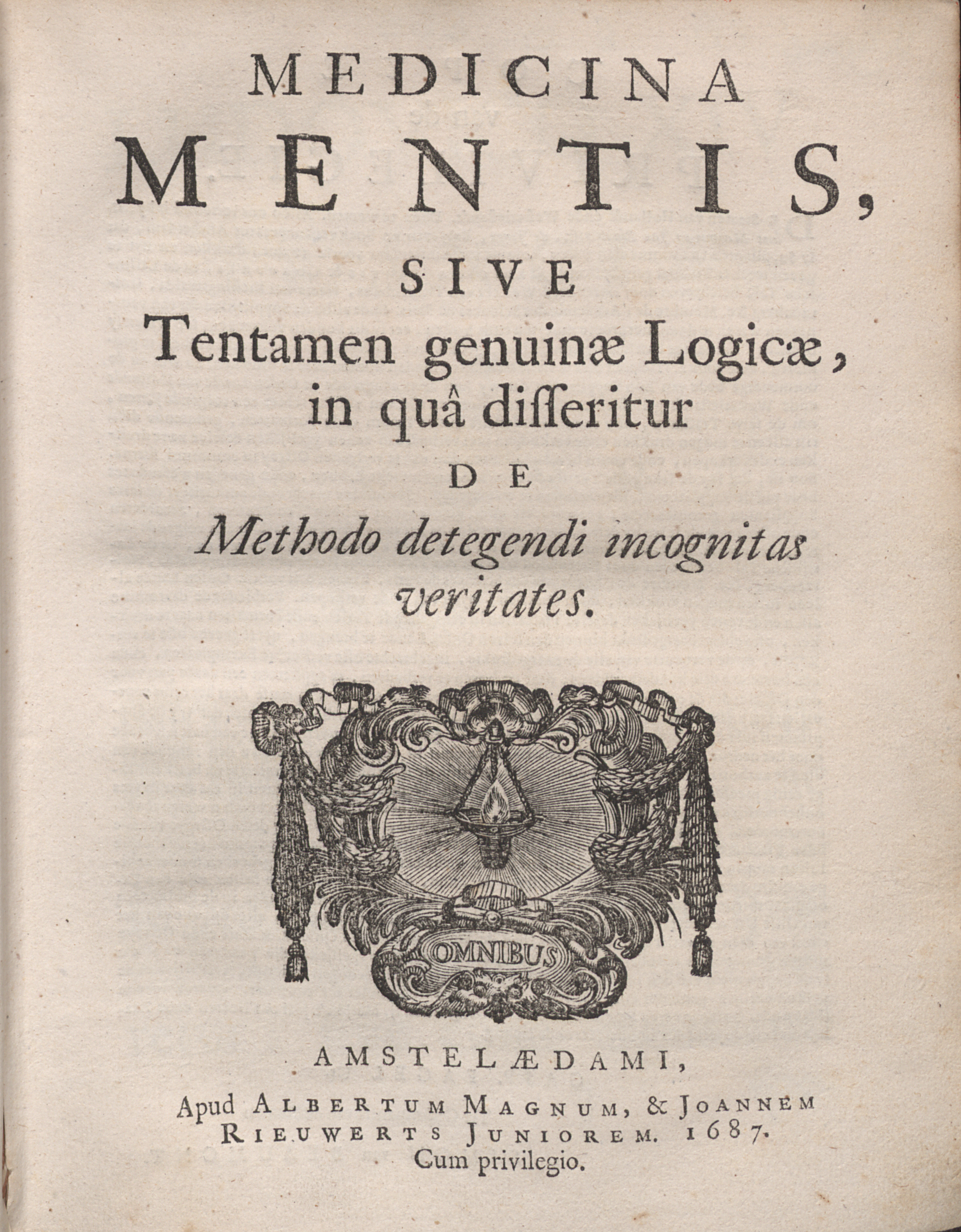
Medicina mentis, 1687

Ehrenfried Walther von Tschirnhaus or Tschirnhauß (German: [ˈeːʁənfʁiːt ˈvaltɐ fɔn ˈtʃɪʁnhaʊs]; 10 April 1651 – 11 October 1708) was a German mathematician, physicist, physician, and philosopher. He introduced the Tschirnhaus transformation and is considered by some to have been the inventor of European porcelain, an invention long accredited to Johann Friedrich Böttger, while others claim porcelain had been made by English manufacturers at an even earlier date.

== Education ==
Tschirnhaus attended the Gymnasium at Görlitz. Thereafter he studied mathematics, philosophy, and medicine at the University of Leiden. He travelled considerably in France, Italy, and Switzerland, and served in the army of Holland (1672–1673). During his travels, he met Baruch de Spinoza and Christiaan Huygens in the Netherlands, Isaac Newton in England, and Gottfried Wilhelm Leibniz (with whom he maintained a lifelong correspondence) in Paris. He became a member of the Académie Royale des Sciences in Paris.

== Mathematician ==
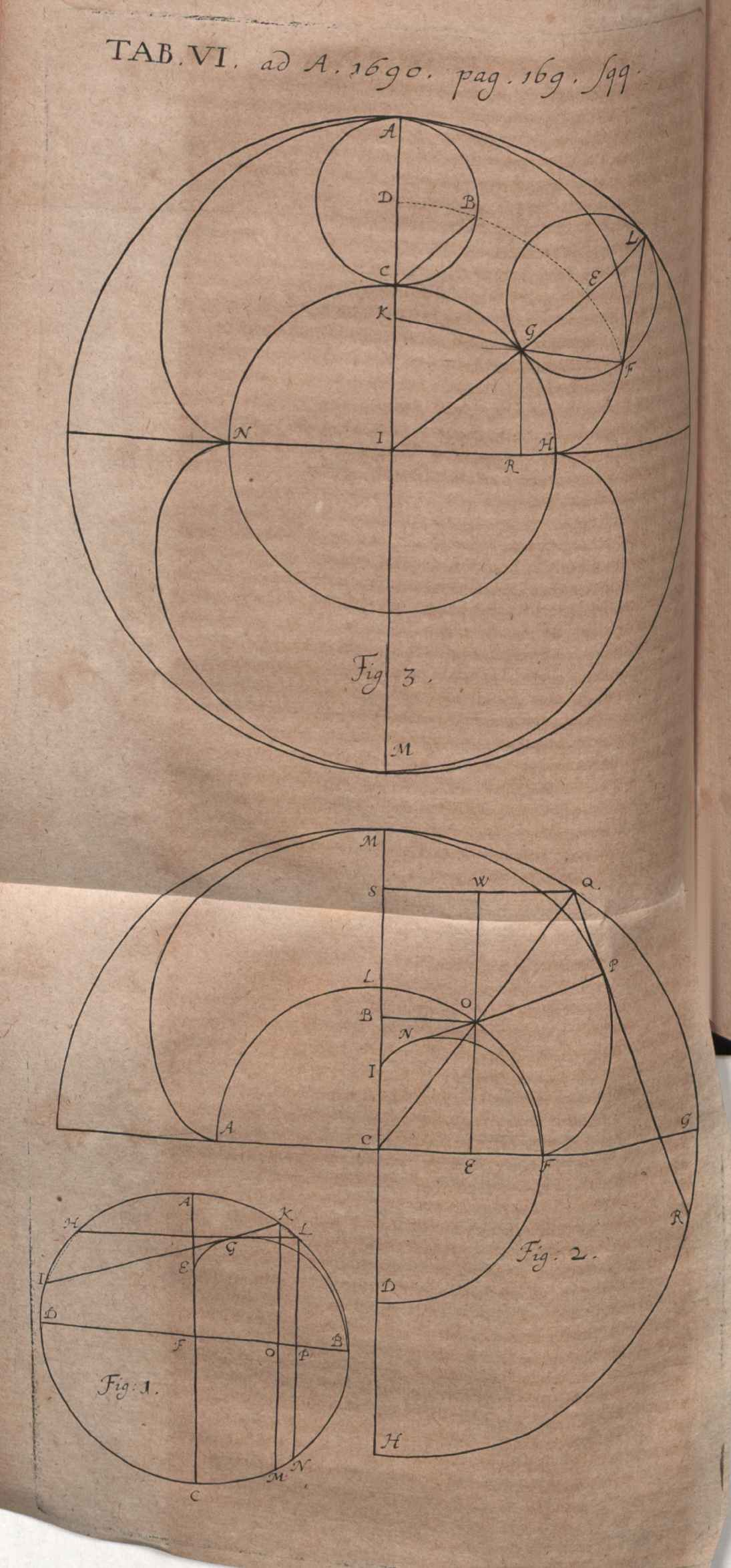
Illustration from Acta Eruditorum, 1690

The Tschirnhaus transformation, by which he removed certain intermediate terms from a given algebraic equation, is well known. It was published in the scientific journal Acta Eruditorum in 1683.

In 1682, Tschirnhaus worked out the theory of catacaustics and showed that they were rectifiable. This was the second case in which the envelope of a moving line was determined. One of the catacaustics of a parabola is still known as Tschirnhausen cubic.

In 1696, Johann Bernoulli posed the problem of the brachistochrone to the readers of Acta Eruditorum. Tschirnhaus was one of only five mathematicians to submit a solution. Bernoulli published these contributions (including Tschirnhaus') along with his own in the journal in May of the following year.

Tschirnhaus produced various types of lenses and mirrors; some of them are displayed in museums. He erected a large glassworks in Saxony, where he constructed burning glasses of unusual perfection and carried on his experiments (1687–1688).

His work Medicina mentis sive artis inveniendi praecepta generali (1687) combines methods of deduction with empiricism and shows him to be philosophically connected to the Enlightenment.

== Philosopher ==
Tschirnhaus was for many years forgotten as a philosopher and the studies treating the subject often discuss Tschirnhaus' connection to other philosophers and scientists at the time. During his time at the University of Leiden, he started correspondence with Spinoza and later also Leibniz. Tschirnhaus was one of the first to get a copy of Spinoza's masterpiece Ethics; it is thought that the copy now in the Vatican Library, the only extant pre-publication copy, may have been Tschirnhaus'. In his correspondence with Spinoza, which has been preserved, he raises several objections to some of the claims in the Ethics, such as what exactly constitutes the immediate infinite causes of the attributes.

== Inventor of porcelain ==
After he returned home to Saxony, Tschirnhaus initiated systematic experiments, using mixtures of various silicates and earths at different temperatures to develop porcelain, which at the time was available only as a costly import from China and Japan. As early as 1704, he showed porcelan to Leibniz's secretary. He proposed the establishment of a porcelain factory to Augustus II of Poland, Elector of Saxony, but was denied. Also in 1704, Tschirnhaus became the supervisor of Johann Friedrich Böttger, a nineteen-year-old alchemist who claimed to be able to make gold. Böttger only reluctantly and under pressure started to participate in Tschirnhaus' work by 1707. The use of kaolin (from Schneeberg, Saxony) and alabaster advanced the work, so that August II named him the director of the porcelain factory he intended to establish. The Elector ordered payment of 2,561 thalers to Tschirnhaus, but the recipient requested postponement until the factory was producing. When Tschirnhaus died suddenly, on 11 October 1708, the project came to a halt.

Three days after Tschirnhaus' death, there was a burglary at his house and, according to a report by Böttger, a small piece of porcelain was stolen. This report suggests that Böttger himself recognized that Tschirnhaus already knew how to make porcelain, a key piece of evidence that Tschirnhaus and not Böttger was the inventor. Work resumed on 20 March 1709, by which time Melchior Steinbrück had arrived to assess the dead man's estate, which included the notes about making porcelain, and had met with Böttger. On 28 March 1709, Böttger went to August II and announced the invention of porcelain. Böttger was nominated to head the first European manufactory for porcelain. Steinbrück became an inspector and married Böttger's sister.

Contemporary testimonies of knowledgeable people indicate that Tschirnhaus invented porcelain. In 1719, for example, writing Samuel Stöltzel of the porcelain factory of Meissen went to Vienna with the still-secret recipe and confirmed that it had been invented by Tschirnhaus and not by Böttger. In that same year, the General Secretary of the Meissen factory also indicated that the invention was not Böttger's “but by the late Herr von Tschirnhaus[,] whose written science” was handed to Böttger "by the inspector Steinbrück." Nevertheless, Böttger's name became closely associated with the invention.

== Works ==
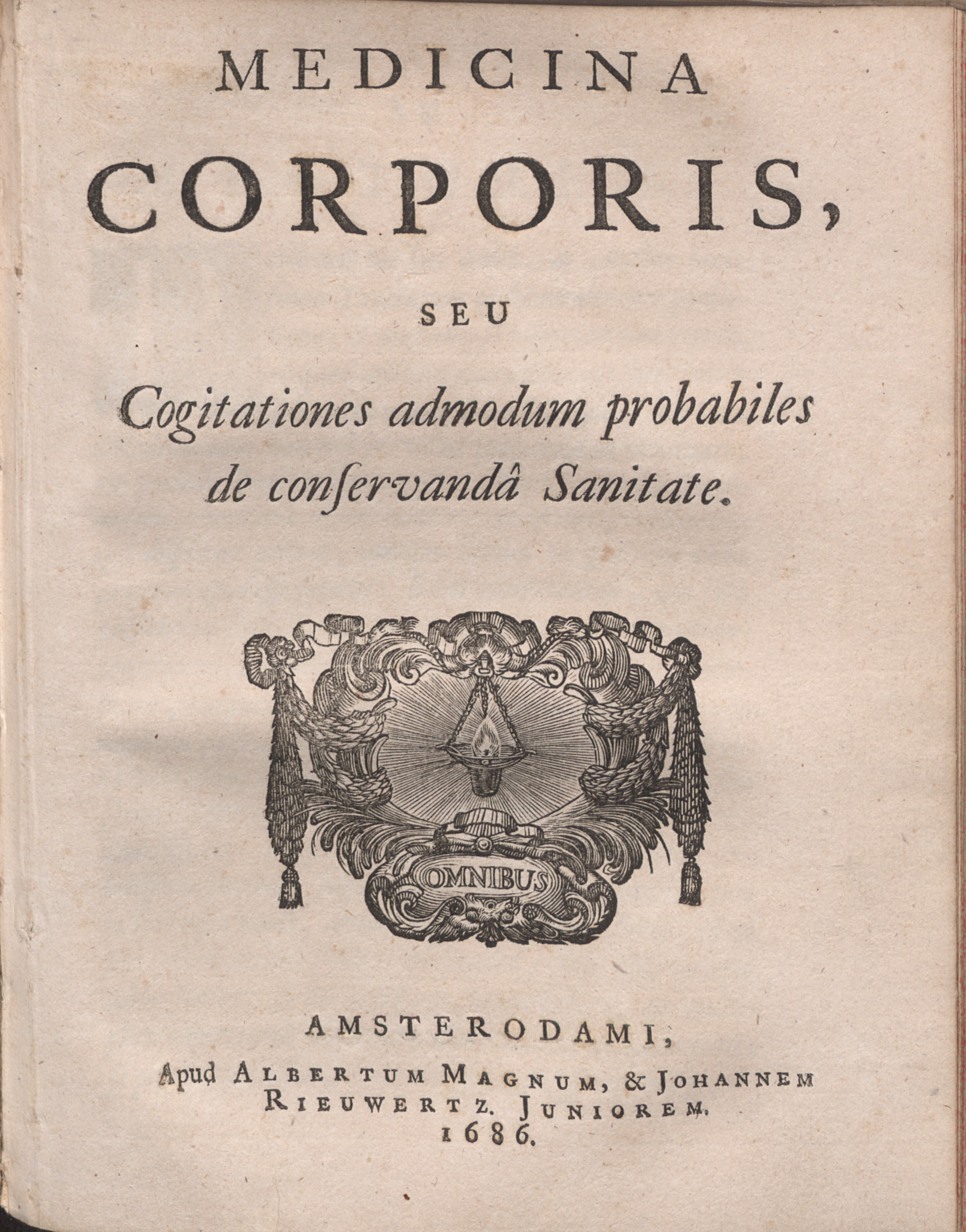
Medicina corporis, 1686

- Medicina corporis, Amsterdam, 1686.
- Medicina mentis, Amsterdam, 1687.
- Medicina mentis et corporis, with an Introduction by Wilhelm Risse. (Anastatic reprint) Hildesheim: Georg Olms, 1964.

== See also ==
- List of German inventors and discoverers
- Generalized conic
