= Quintic equation =

Polynomial equation of degree 5

In mathematics, a quintic equation is one which can be expressed as a quintic function equaling zero.

Graph of a polynomial of degree 5, with 3 real zeros (roots) and 4 critical points

The general form of a quintic equation is

$ax^5+bx^4+cx^3+dx^2+ex+f=0\,$ assuming a ≠ 0.

The corresponding quintic function is a function of the form

$$g(x)=ax^5+bx^4+cx^3+dx^2+ex+f,\,$$

where a, b, c, d, e and f are members of a field, typically the rational numbers, the real numbers or the complex numbers, and a is nonzero. In other words, a quintic function is defined by a polynomial of degree five. Since they have an odd degree, normal quintic functions appear similar to normal cubic functions when graphed, except they may possess one additional local maximum and one additional local minimum. The derivative of a quintic function is a quartic function.

Solving quintic equations in terms of radicals (nth roots) was a major problem in algebra from the 16th century, when cubic and quartic equations were solved, until the first half of the 19th century, when the impossibility of such a general solution was proved with the Abel–Ruffini theorem.

== Finding roots of a quintic polynomial ==
Finding the roots (zeros) of a given polynomial has been a prominent mathematical problem.

Solving linear, quadratic, cubic and quartic equations in terms of radicals and elementary arithmetic operations on the coefficients can always be done, no matter whether the roots are rational or irrational, real or complex; there are formulas that yield the required solutions. However, there is no algebraic expression (that is, in terms of radicals) for the solutions of general quintic equations over the rationals; this statement is known as the Abel–Ruffini theorem, first asserted in 1799 and completely proven in 1824. This result also holds for equations of higher degree. An example of a quintic whose roots cannot be expressed in terms of radicals is x^{5} − x + 1 = 0.

Numerical approximations of quintics roots can be computed with root-finding algorithms for polynomials. Although some quintics may be solved in terms of radicals, the solution is generally too complicated to be used in practice.

== Solvable quintics ==
Some quintic equations can be solved in terms of radicals. These include the quintic equations defined by a polynomial that is reducible, such as x^{5} − x^{4} − x + 1 = (x^{2} + 1)(x + 1)(x − 1)^{2}. For example, it has been shown that

$$x^5-x-r=0$$

has solutions in radicals if and only if it has an integer solution or r is one of ±15, ±22440, or ±2759640, in which cases the polynomial is reducible.

As solving reducible quintic equations reduces immediately to solving polynomials of lower degree, only irreducible quintic equations are considered in the remainder of this section, and the term "quintic" will refer only to irreducible quintics. A solvable quintic is thus an irreducible quintic polynomial whose roots may be expressed in terms of radicals.

To characterize solvable quintics, and more generally solvable polynomials of higher degree, Évariste Galois developed techniques which gave rise to group theory and Galois theory. Applying these techniques, Arthur Cayley found a general criterion for determining whether any given quintic is solvable. This criterion is the following.

Given the equation

$$ax^5+bx^4+cx^3+dx^2+ex+f=0,$$

the Tschirnhaus transformation x = y − b/5a, which depresses the quintic (that is, removes the term of degree four), gives the equation

$$y^5+p y^3+q y^2+r y+s=0,$$

where

$$\begin{align}p &= \frac{5ac-2b^2}{5a^2}\\[4pt]
q &= \frac{25a^2d-15abc+4b^3}{25a^3}\\[4pt]
r &= \frac{125a^3e-50a^2bd+15ab^2c-3b^4}{125a^4}\\[4pt]
s &= \frac{3125 a^4f-625a^3 be+125a^2b^2 d-25ab^3 c+4 b^5}{3125a^5}\end{align}$$

Both quintics are solvable by radicals if and only if either they are factorisable in equations of lower degrees with rational coefficients or the polynomial P^{2} − 1024 z Δ, named Cayley's resolvent, has a rational root in z, where

$$\begin{align}
P = {} &z^3-z^2(20r+3p^2)- z(8p^2r - 16pq^2- 240r^2 + 400sq - 3p^4)\\[4pt]
&- p^6 + 28p^4r- 16p^3q^2- 176p^2r^2- 80p^2sq + 224prq^2- 64q^4 \\[4pt]
&+ 4000ps^2 + 320r^3- 1600rsq
\end{align}$$

and

$$\begin{align}
\Delta = {} &-128p^2r^4+3125s^4-72p^4qrs+560p^2qr^2s+16p^4r^3+256r^5+108p^5s^2 \\[4pt]
&-1600qr^3s+144pq^2r^3-900p^3rs^2+2000pr^2s^2-3750pqs^3+825p^2q^2s^2 \\[4pt]
&+2250q^2rs^2+108q^5s-27q^4r^2-630pq^3rs+16p^3q^3s-4p^3q^2r^2. \end{align}$$

Cayley's result allows us to test if a quintic is solvable. If it is the case, finding its roots is a more difficult problem, which consists of expressing the roots in terms of radicals involving the coefficients of the quintic and the rational root of Cayley's resolvent.

In 1888, George Paxton Young described how to solve a solvable quintic equation, without providing an explicit formula; in 2004, Daniel Lazard wrote out a three-page formula.

=== Quintics in Bring–Jerrard form ===
There are several parametric representations of solvable quintics of the form x^{5} + ax + b = 0, called the Bring–Jerrard form.

During the second half of the 19th century, John Stuart Glashan, George Paxton Young, and Carl Runge gave such a parameterization: an irreducible quintic with rational coefficients in Bring–Jerrard form is solvable if and only if either a = 0 or it may be written

$$x^5 + \frac{5\mu^4(4\nu + 3)}{\nu^2 + 1}x + \frac{4\mu^5(2\nu + 1)(4\nu + 3)}{\nu^2 + 1} = 0$$

where μ and ν are rational.

In 1994, Blair Spearman and Kenneth S. Williams gave an alternative,

$$x^5 + \frac{5e^4( 4c + 3)}{c^2 + 1}x + \frac{-4e^5(2c-11)}{c^2 + 1} = 0.$$

The relationship between the 1885 and 1994 parameterizations can be seen by defining the expression

$$b = \frac{4}{5} \left(a+20 \pm 2\sqrt{(20-a)(5+a)}\right)$$

where $a=5\tfrac{4\nu+3}{\nu^2+1}$. Using the negative case of the square root yields, after scaling variables, the first parametrization while the positive case gives the second.

The substitution $c = - \tfrac{m}{\ell^5},$ $e = \tfrac{1}{\ell}$ in the Spearman–Williams parameterization allows one to not exclude the special case a = 0, giving the following result:

If a and b are rational numbers, the equation x^{5} + ax + b = 0 is solvable by radicals if either its left-hand side is a product of polynomials of degree less than 5 with rational coefficients or there exist two rational numbers ℓ and m such that

$$a=\frac{5 \ell (3 \ell^5-4 m)}{m^2+\ell^{10}}\qquad b=\frac{4(11 \ell^5+2 m)}{m^2+\ell^{10}}.$$

=== Roots of a solvable quintic ===
A polynomial equation is solvable by radicals if its Galois group is a solvable group. In the case of irreducible quintics, the Galois group is a subgroup of the symmetric group S_{5} of all permutations of a five element set, which is solvable if and only if it is a subgroup of the group F_{5}, of order 20, generated by the cyclic permutations (1 2 3 4 5) and (1 2 4 3).

If the quintic is solvable, one of the solutions may be represented by an algebraic expression involving a fifth root and at most two square roots, generally nested. The other solutions may then be obtained either by changing the fifth root or by multiplying all the occurrences of the fifth root by the same power of a primitive 5th root of unity, such as

$$e^{i\frac{2\pi}{5}} = \frac{\sqrt{-10-2\sqrt{5}}+\sqrt{5}-1}{4}.$$

In fact, all four primitive fifth roots of unity may be obtained by changing the signs of the square roots appropriately; namely, the expression

$$\frac{\alpha\sqrt{-10-2\beta\sqrt{5}}+\beta\sqrt{5}-1}{4},$$

where $\alpha, \beta \in \{-1,1\}$, yields the four distinct primitive fifth roots of unity.

It follows that one may need four different square roots for writing all the roots of a solvable quintic. Even for the first root that involves at most two square roots, the expression of the solutions in terms of radicals is usually highly complicated. However, when no square root is needed, the form of the first solution may be rather simple, as for the equation x^{5} − 5x^{4} + 30x^{3} − 50x^{2} + 55x − 21 = 0, for which the only real solution is

$$x=1+\sqrt[5]{2}-\left(\sqrt[5]{2}\right)^2+\left(\sqrt[5]{2}\right)^3-\left(\sqrt[5]{2}\right)^4.$$

An example of a more complicated (although small enough to be written here) solution is the unique real root of x^{5} − 5x + 12 = 0. Let a = √2φ^{−1}, b = √2φ, and c = ^{4}√5, where φ = (1+√5)/2 is the golden ratio. Then the only real solution x = −1.84208... is given by

$$-cx = \sqrt[5]{(a+c)^2(b-c)} + \sqrt[5]{(-a+c)(b-c)^2} + \sqrt[5]{(a+c)(b+c)^2} - \sqrt[5]{(-a+c)^2(b+c)} \,,$$

or, equivalently, by

$$x = \sqrt[5]{y_1}+\sqrt[5]{y_2}+\sqrt[5]{y_3}+\sqrt[5]{y_4}\,,$$

where the y_{i} are the four roots of the quartic equation

$$y^4+4y^3+\frac{4}{5}y^2-\frac{8}{5^3}y-\frac{1}{5^5}=0\,.$$

More generally, if an equation P(x) = 0 of prime degree p with rational coefficients is solvable in radicals, then one can define an auxiliary equation Q(y) = 0 of degree p − 1, also with rational coefficients, such that each root of P is the sum of p-th roots of the roots of Q. These p-th roots were introduced by Joseph-Louis Lagrange, and their products by p are commonly called Lagrange resolvents. The computation of Q and its roots can be used to solve P(x) = 0. However these p-th roots may not be computed independently (this would provide p^{p−1} roots instead of p). Thus a correct solution needs to express all these p-roots in term of one of them. Galois theory shows that this is always theoretically possible, even if the resulting formula may be too large to be of any use.

It is possible that some of the roots of Q are rational (as in the first example of this section) or some are zero. In these cases, the formula for the roots is much simpler, as for the solvable de Moivre quintic

$$x^5+5ax^3+5a^2x+b = 0\,,$$

where the auxiliary equation has two zero roots and reduces, by factoring them out, to the quadratic equation

$$y^2+by-a^5 = 0\,,$$

such that the five roots of the de Moivre quintic are given by

$$x_k = \omega^k\sqrt[5]{y_i} -\frac{a}{\omega^k\sqrt[5]{y_i}},$$

where y_{i} is any root of the auxiliary quadratic equation and ω is any of the four primitive 5th roots of unity. This can be easily generalized to construct a solvable septic and other odd degrees, not necessarily prime.

=== Other solvable quintics ===
There are infinitely many solvable quintics in Bring–Jerrard form which have been parameterized in a preceding section.

Up to the scaling of the variable, there are exactly five solvable quintics of the shape $x^5+ax^2+b$, which are (where s is a scaling factor):

$$x^5-2s^3x^2-\frac{s^5}{5}$$
$$x^5-100s^3x^2-1000s^5$$
$$x^5-5s^3x^2-3s^5$$
$$x^5-5s^3x^2+15s^5$$
$$x^5-25s^3x^2-300s^5$$

Paxton Young (1888) gave a number of examples of solvable quintics:

| $x^5-10x^3-20x^2-1505x-7412$ |
| $x^5+\frac{625}{4}x+3750$ |
| $x^5-\frac{22}{5}x^3-\frac{11}{25}x^2+\frac{462}{125}x+\frac{979}{3125}$ |
| $x^5+20x^3+20x^2+30x+10$ | $~\qquad ~$ Root: $\sqrt[5]{2}-\sqrt[5]{2}^2+\sqrt[5]{2}^3-\sqrt[5]{2}^4$ |
| $x^5-20x^3+250x-400$ |
| $x^5-5x^3+\frac{85}{8}x-\frac{13}{2}$ |
| $x^5+\frac{20}{17}x+\frac{21}{17}$ |
| $x^5-\frac{4}{13}x+\frac{29}{65}$ |
| $x^5+\frac{10}{13}x+\frac{3}{13}$ |
| $x^5+110(5x^3+60x^2+800x+8320)$ |
| $x^5-20 x^3 -80x^2 -150x -656$ |
| $x^5 -40x^3 +160x^2 +1000x -5888$ |
| $x^5-50x^3-600x^2-2000x-11200$ |
| $x^5+110(5x^3 + 20x^2 -360x +800)$ |
| $x^5 -20x^3 +170x + 208$ |

An infinite sequence of solvable quintics may be constructed, whose roots are sums of nth roots of unity, with n = 10k + 1 being a prime number:

| $x^5+x^4-4x^3-3x^2+3x+1$ | | Roots: $2\cos\left(\frac{2k\pi}{11}\right)$ |
| $x^5+x^4-12x^3-21x^2+x+5$ | | Root: $\sum_{k=0}^5 e^\frac{2i\pi 6^k }{31}$ |
| $x^5+x^4-16x^3+5x^2+21x-9$ | | Root: $\sum_{k=0}^7 e^\frac{2i\pi 3^k }{41}$ |
| $x^5+x^4-24x^3-17x^2+41x-13$ | $~\qquad ~$ | Root: $\sum_{k=0}^{11} e^\frac{2i\pi (21)^k }{61}$ |
| $x^5+x^4 - 28x^3 + 37x^2 + 25x + 1$ | | Root: $\sum_{k=0}^{13} e^\frac{2i\pi (23)^k }{71}$ |

There are also two parameterized families of solvable quintics: The Kondo–Brumer quintic,

$$x^5 + (a-3)\,x^4 + (-a+b+3)\,x^3 + (a^2-a-1-2b)\,x^2 + b\,x + a = 0$$

and the family depending on the parameters $a, \ell, m$

$$x^5 - 5\,p \left( 2\,x^3 + a\,x^2 + b\,x \right) - p\,c = 0$$

where

$$p = \tfrac{1}{4} \left[\, \ell^2 (4m^2 + a^2) - m^2 \,\right] \;,$$

$$b = \ell \, ( 4m^2 + a^2 ) - 5p - 2m^2 \;,$$

$$c = \tfrac{1}{2} \left[\, b(a + 4m) - p(a - 4m) - a^2m  \,\right] \;.$$

=== Casus irreducibilis ===
Analogously to cubic equations, there are solvable quintics which have five real roots all of whose solutions in radicals involve roots of complex numbers. This is casus irreducibilis for the quintic, which is discussed in Dummit. Indeed, if an irreducible quintic has all roots real, no root can be expressed purely in terms of real radicals (as is true for all polynomial degrees that are not powers of 2).

== Beyond radicals ==
About 1835, Jerrard demonstrated that quintics can be solved by using ultraradicals (also known as Bring radicals), the unique real root of t^{5} + t − a = 0 for real numbers a. In 1858, Charles Hermite showed that the Bring radical could be characterized in terms of the Jacobi theta functions and their associated elliptic modular functions, using an approach similar to the more familiar approach of solving cubic equations by means of trigonometric functions. At around the same time, Leopold Kronecker, using group theory, developed a simpler way of deriving Hermite's result, as had Francesco Brioschi. Later, Felix Klein came up with a method that relates the symmetries of the icosahedron, Galois theory, and the elliptic modular functions that are featured in Hermite's solution, giving an explanation for why they should appear at all, and developed his own solution in terms of generalized hypergeometric functions. Similar phenomena occur in degree 7 (septic equations) and 11, as studied by Klein and discussed in Icosahedral symmetry § Related geometries.

=== Solving with Bring radicals ===
A Tschirnhaus transformation, which may be computed by solving a quartic equation, reduces the general quintic equation of the form

$$x^5 + a_4x^4 + a_3x^3 + a_2x^2 + a_1x + a_0 = 0\,$$

to the Bring–Jerrard normal form x^{5} − x + t = 0.

The roots of this equation cannot be expressed by radicals. However, in 1858, Charles Hermite published the first known solution of this equation in terms of elliptic functions. At around the same time Francesco Brioschi and Leopold Kronecker came upon equivalent solutions.

See Bring radical for details on these solutions and some related ones.

== Application to celestial mechanics ==
Solving for the locations of the Lagrangian points of an astronomical orbit in which the masses of both objects are non-negligible involves solving a quintic.

More precisely, the locations of L_{2} and L_{1} are the solutions to the following equations, where the gravitational forces of two masses on a third (for example, Sun and Earth on satellites such as Gaia and the James Webb Space Telescope at L_{2} and SOHO at L_{1}) provide the satellite's centripetal force necessary to be in a synchronous orbit with Earth around the Sun:

$$\frac{G m M_S}{(R \pm r)^2} \pm \frac{G m M_E}{r^2} = m \omega^2 (R \pm r)$$

The ± sign corresponds to L_{2} and L_{1}, respectively; G is the gravitational constant, ω the angular velocity, r the distance of the satellite to Earth, R the distance Sun to Earth (that is, the semi-major axis of Earth's orbit), and m, M_{E}, and M_{S} are the respective masses of satellite, Earth, and Sun.

Using Kepler's Third Law $\omega^2=\frac{4 \pi^2}{P^2}=\frac{G (M_S+M_E)}{R^3}$ and rearranging all terms yields the quintic

$$a r^5 + b r^4 + c r^3 + d r^2 + e r + f = 0$$

with:

$$\begin{align}
&a = \pm (M_S + M_E),\\
&b = + (M_S + M_E) 3 R,\\
&c = \pm (M_S + M_E) 3 R^2,\\
&d = + (M_E \mp M_E) R^3\ (\text{thus } d = 0\text{ for } L_2),\\
&e = \pm M_E 2 R^4,\\
&f = \mp M_E R^5.
\end{align}$$

Solving these two quintics yields r = 1.501 × 10^{9} m for L_{2} and r = 1.491 × 10^{9} m for L_{1}. The Sun–Earth Lagrangian points L_{2} and L_{1} are usually given as 1.5 million km from Earth.

If the mass of the smaller object (M_{E}) is much smaller than the mass of the larger object (M_{S}), then the quintic equation can be greatly reduced and L_{1} and L_{2} are at approximately the radius of the Hill sphere, given by:

$$r \approx R \sqrt[3]{\frac{M_E}{3 M_S}}$$

That also yields r = 1.5 × 10^{9} m for satellites at L_{1} and L_{2} in the Sun-Earth system.

== See also ==
- Sextic equation
- Septic function
- Theory of equations
- Principal equation form
