= Nth root =

Arithmetic operation, inverse of nth power

Modern notation for the nth root of the variable x

In mathematics, an nth root of a number x is the number r which, when n copies are multiplied together, yields x:
$$r^n = \underbrace{r \times r \times \dotsb \times r}_{n\text{ factors}} = x.$$
The positive integer n is called the index or degree, and the number x of which the root is taken is the radicand. A root of degree 2 is called a square root and a root of degree 3, a cube root. Roots of higher degree are referred by using ordinal numbers, as in fourth root, twentieth root, etc. The computation of an nth root is a root extraction.

The nth root of x is written as $\sqrt[n]{x}$ using the radical symbol $\sqrt{\phantom x}$. The square root is usually written as $\sqrt x$, with the degree omitted. Taking the nth root of a number, for fixed $n$, is the inverse of raising a number to the nth power, and can be written as a fractional exponent:

$$\sqrt[n]{x} = x^{1/n}.$$

For a positive real number x, $\sqrt{x}$ denotes the positive square root of x and $\sqrt[n]{x}$ denotes the positive real nth root. For example, 3 is a square root of 9, since 3^{2} = 9, and −3 is also a square root of 9, since (−3)^{2} = 9. A negative real number −x has no real-valued square roots, but when x is treated as a complex number it has two imaginary square roots, $+i\sqrt x$ and $-i\sqrt x$, where i is the imaginary unit.

In general, any non-zero complex number has n distinct complex-valued nth roots, equally distributed around a complex circle of constant absolute value. (The nth root of 0 is zero with multiplicity n, and this circle degenerates to a point.) Extracting the nth roots of a complex number x can thus be taken to be a multivalued function. By convention the principal value of this function, called the principal root and denoted $\sqrt[n]{x}$, is taken to be the nth root with the greatest real part and in the special case when x is a negative real number, the one with a positive imaginary part. The principal root of a positive real number is thus also a positive real number. As a function, the principal root is continuous in the whole complex plane, except along the negative real axis. The nth roots of 1 are called roots of unity and play a fundamental role in various areas of mathematics, such as number theory, theory of equations, and Fourier transform.

An unresolved root, especially one using the radical symbol, is sometimes referred to as a surd or a radical. Any expression containing a radical, whether it is a square root, a cube root, or a higher root, is called a radical expression, and if it contains no transcendental numbers or transcendental functions it is called an algebraic expression.

== History ==
The Babylonians, as early as 1800 BCE, demonstrated numerical approximations of irrational quantities such as the square root of 2 on clay tablets, with an accuracy analogous to six decimal places, as in the tablet YBC 7289. Cuneiform tablets from Larsa include tables of square and cube roots of integers. The first to prove the irrationality of √2 was most likely the Pythagorean Hippasus. Plato in his Theaetetus, then describes how Theodorus of Cyrene (c. 400 BC) proved the irrationality of $\sqrt3$, $\sqrt5$, etc. up to $\sqrt{17}$. In the first century AD, Heron of Alexandria devised an iterative method to compute the square root, which is actually a special case of the more general Newton's method.

The term surd traces back to Al-Khwarizmi (c. 825), who referred to rational and irrational numbers as "audible" and "inaudible", respectively. This later led to the Arabic word أصم (asamm, meaning "deaf" or "dumb") for "irrational number" being translated into Latin as surdus (meaning "deaf" or "mute"). Gerard of Cremona (c. 1150), Fibonacci (1202), and then Robert Recorde (1551) all used the term to refer to "unresolved irrational roots", that is, expressions of the form $\sqrt[n]{r}$, in which $n$ and $r$ are integer numerals and the whole expression denotes an irrational number. Irrational numbers of the form $\pm\sqrt{a},$ where $a$ is rational, are called "pure quadratic surds"; irrational numbers of the form $a \pm\sqrt{b}$, where $a$ and $b$ are rational, are called mixed quadratic surds. An archaic term from the late 15th century for the operation of taking nth roots is radication, and an unresolved root is a radical.

In the fourteenth century, Jamshid al-Kashi used an iterative technique now called the Ruffini-Horner method to extract nth roots for an arbitrary n. This technique has been used since antiquity to determine square roots, then by China and Kushyar ibn Labban during the tenth century to determine cube roots. In 1665, Isaac Newton discovered the general binomial theorem, which can convert an nth root into an infinite series. Based on approach developed by François Viète, Newton devised an iterative method for solving a non-linear function of the form $f(x) = 0$, which can be used to extract an nth root. This technique was further refined by Joseph Raphson and became known as the Newton–Raphson method. In 1690, Michel Rolle introduced the notation $\sqrt[n]{a}$ for the nth root of the value a.

In 1629, Albert Girard proposed the fundamental theorem of algebra, but failed to produce a proof. This theorem states that every single-variable polynomial of degree n has n roots. Further, a polynomial with complex coefficients has at least one complex root. Equivalently, the theorem states that the field of complex numbers is algebraically closed. Among the notable mathematicians who worked on a proof during the 18th and 19th centuries were d'Alembert, Gauss, Bolzano, and Weierstrass, with Gauss usually being credited with the first correct proof. A consequence of this proof is that any nth root of a real or complex number will be on the complex plane.

The ancient Greek mathematicians knew how to use compass and straightedge to construct a length equal to the square root of a given length, when an auxiliary line of unit length is given. In 1837 Pierre Wantzel proved that an nth root of a given length cannot be constructed if n is not a power of 2.

== Definition and notation ==
The four 4th roots of −1, none of which are real

The three 3rd roots of −1, one of which is a negative real

An nth root of a number x, where n is a positive integer, is any of the n real or complex numbers r whose nth power is x:

$$r^n = x.$$

Every positive real number x has a single positive nth root, called the principal nth root, which is written $\sqrt[n]{x}$. For n equal to 2 this is called the principal square root and the n is omitted. The nth root can also be represented using exponentiation as x^{1/n}.

For even values of n, positive numbers also have a negative nth root, while negative numbers do not have a real nth root. For odd values of n, every negative number x has a real negative nth root. For example, −2 has a real 5th root, $\sqrt[5]{-2} = -1.148698354\ldots$ but −2 does not have any real 6th roots.

Every non-zero number x, real or complex, has n different complex number nth roots. (In the case x is real, this count includes any real nth roots.) The only complex root of 0 is 0.

The nth roots of almost all numbers (all integers except the nth powers, and all rationals except the quotients of two nth powers) are irrational. For example,

$$\sqrt{2} = 1.414213562\ldots$$

All nth roots of rational numbers are algebraic numbers, and all nth roots of integers are algebraic integers.

=== Square roots ===
The graph $y=\pm \sqrt{x}$.

A square root of a number x is a number r which, when squared, becomes x:

$$r^2 = x.$$

Every positive real number has two square roots, one positive and one negative. For example, the two square roots of 25 are 5 and −5. The positive square root is also known as the principal square root, and is denoted with a radical sign:

$$\sqrt{25} = 5.$$

Since the square of every real number is nonnegative, negative numbers do not have real square roots. However, for every negative real number there are two imaginary square roots. For example, the square roots of −25 are 5i and −5i, where i represents a number whose square is −1.

=== Cube roots ===
The graph $y=\sqrt[3]{x}$.

A cube root of a number x is a number r whose cube is x:

$$r^3 = x.$$

Every real number x has exactly one real cube root, written $\sqrt[3]{x}$. For example,

$$\begin{align}
\sqrt[3]{8} &= 2\\
\sqrt[3]{-8} &= -2.
\end{align}$$

Every real number has two additional complex cube roots.

== Identities and properties ==
Expressing the degree of an nth root in its exponent form, as in $x^{1/n}$, makes it easier to manipulate powers and roots. If $a$ is a non-negative real number,

$$\sqrt[n]{a^m} = (a^m)^{1/n} = a^{m/n} = (a^{1/n})^m = (\sqrt[n]a)^m.$$

Every non-negative number has exactly one non-negative real nth root, and so the rules for operations with surds involving non-negative radicands $a$ and $b$ are straightforward within the real numbers:

$$\begin{align}
\sqrt[n]{ab} &= \sqrt[n]{a} \sqrt[n]{b} \\
\sqrt[n]{\frac{a}{b}} &= \frac{\sqrt[n]{a}}{\sqrt[n]{b}}
\end{align}$$

Subtleties can occur when taking the nth roots of negative or complex numbers. For instance:

$$\sqrt{-1}\times\sqrt{-1} \neq \sqrt{-1 \times -1} = 1,\quad$$

but, rather,

$$\quad\sqrt{-1}\times\sqrt{-1} = i \times i = i^2 = -1.$$

Since the rule $\sqrt[n]{a} \times \sqrt[n]{b} = \sqrt[n]{ab}$ strictly holds for non-negative real radicands only, its application leads to the inequality in the first step above.

== Simplified form of a radical expression ==
A non-nested radical expression is said to be in simplified form if no factor of the radicand can be written as a power greater than or equal to the index; there are no fractions inside the radical sign; and there are no radicals in the denominator.

For example, to write the radical expression $\textstyle \sqrt{32/5}$ in simplified form, we can proceed as follows. First, look for a perfect square under the square root sign and remove it:

$$\sqrt{\frac{32}{5}} = \sqrt{\frac{16 \cdot 2}{5}}
= \sqrt{16} \cdot \sqrt{\frac{2}{5}} = 4 \sqrt{\frac{2}{5}}$$

Next, there is a fraction under the radical sign, which we change as follows:

$$4 \sqrt{\frac{2}{5}} = \frac{4 \sqrt{2}}{\sqrt{5}}$$

Finally, we remove the radical from the denominator as follows:

$$\frac{4 \sqrt{2}}{\sqrt{5}} = \frac{4 \sqrt{2}}{\sqrt{5}} \cdot \frac{\sqrt{5}}{\sqrt{5}} = \frac{4 \sqrt{10}}{5} = \frac{4}{5}\sqrt{10}$$

When there is a denominator involving surds it is always possible to find a factor to multiply both numerator and denominator by to simplify the expression. For instance using the factorization of the sum of two cubes:

$$\frac{1}{\sqrt[3]{a} + \sqrt[3]{b}} =
\frac{\sqrt[3]{a^2} - \sqrt[3]{ab} + \sqrt[3]{b^2}}{\left(\sqrt[3]{a} + \sqrt[3]{b}\right)\left(\sqrt[3]{a^2} - \sqrt[3]{ab} + \sqrt[3]{b^2}\right)} =
\frac{\sqrt[3]{a^2} - \sqrt[3]{ab} + \sqrt[3]{b^2}}{a + b} .$$

Simplifying radical expressions involving nested radicals can be quite difficult. In particular, denesting is not always possible, and when possible, it may involve advanced Galois theory. Moreover, when complete denesting is impossible, there is no general canonical form such that the equality of two numbers can be tested by simply looking at their canonical expressions.

For example, it is not obvious that

$$\sqrt{3 + 2\sqrt{2}} = 1 + \sqrt{2}.$$

The above can be derived through:

$$\sqrt{3 + 2\sqrt{2}} = \sqrt{1 + 2\sqrt{2} + 2} = \sqrt{1^2 + 2\sqrt{2} + \sqrt{2}^2} = \sqrt{\left(1 + \sqrt{2}\right)^2} = 1 + \sqrt{2}$$

Let $r=p/q$, with p and q coprime and positive integers. Then $\sqrt[n]r = \sqrt[n]{p}/\sqrt[n]{q}$ is rational if and only if both $\sqrt[n]{p}$ and $\sqrt[n]{q}$ are integers, which means that both p and q are nth powers of some integer.

== Infinite series ==
The radical or root may be represented by the generalized binomial theorem:

$$(1+x)^{s/t} = \sum_{m=0}^\infty \frac{x^m}{m!} \prod_{k=0}^{m-1} \left(\frac st - k\right)$$

with $|x|<1$. This expression can be derived from the binomial series. For the nth root, this becomes

$$(1+x)^\frac{1}{n} = \sum_{m=0}^\infty \frac{x^m}{m!} \prod_{k=0}^{m-1} \left(\frac{1}{n} - k\right)$$

For numbers $r \ge 2$, choose a value $p$ such that

$$\frac{r}{p^n} - 1 = x', \text{ where } |x'| < 1$$

then per above, solve for

$$r^\frac{1}{n} = p (1 + x')^\frac{1}{n}$$

As an example, for $r = 30$ and $n = 2$, choose $p = 5$

$$\frac{30}{5^2} - 1 = \frac{5}{25} = .2$$

$$\sqrt{30} = 5 \sqrt{1 + .2} = 5\left[ 1 + \frac{1}{2} (.2)^1 - \frac{1}{8} (.2)^2 + \frac{1}{16}(.2)^3 - \cdots \right] \approx 5.4775$$

Nth roots are used to check for convergence of a power series with the root test.

== Computing principal roots ==
=== Using Newton's method ===
The nth root of a positive real number A can be computed with Newton's method, which starts with an initial guess x_{0}, which is also a positive real number, and then iterates using the recurrence relation

$$x_{k+1} = x_k-\frac{x_k^n-A}{nx_k^{n-1}}$$

until the desired precision is reached. For computational efficiency, the recurrence relation can be rewritten

$$x_{k+1} = \frac{1}{n} \left[(n-1)\,x_k+\,\frac{A}{x_k^{n-1}}\right].$$

This allows the relation to only have one exponentiation, which is computed once for each iteration. The nth root of x can then be defined as the limit of $x_k$ as k approaches infinity.

For example, to find the fifth root of 34, we plug in n = 5, A = 34 and x_{0} = 2 (initial guess). The first 5 iterations are, approximately:

x_{0} = 2
x_{1} = 2.025
x_{2} = 2.02439 7...
x_{3} = 2.02439 7458...
x_{4} = 2.02439 74584 99885 04251 08172...
x_{5} = 2.02439 74584 99885 04251 08172 45541 93741 91146 21701 07311 8...

(All correct digits shown.)

The approximation x_{4} is accurate to 25 decimal places and x_{5} is good for 51.

Newton's method can be modified to produce various generalized continued fractions for the nth root. For example,

$$\sqrt[n]{z} = \sqrt[n]{x^n+y} = x+\cfrac{y} {nx^{n-1}+\cfrac{(n-1)y} {2x+\cfrac{(n+1)y} {3nx^{n-1}+\cfrac{(2n-1)y} {2x+\cfrac{(2n+1)y} {5nx^{n-1}+\cfrac{(3n-1)y} {2x+\ddots}}}}}}.$$

A suitable initial guess for Newton's method may need to be identified using the bisection method or method of false position. For large values of n and higher requirements for precision, a more rapid algorithm than Newton's method for finding the nth root is to use a truncated Taylor series with a Padé approximant.

=== Using the Viète technique ===
Pascal's triangle showing $P(4,1) = 4$.

The technique of François Viète, published c. 1600, can be used to perform digit-by-digit calculation of principal roots of decimal (base 10) numbers. This method is based on the binomial theorem and is essentially an inverse algorithm solving
$$(10 x+y)^n = \sum_{k=0}^n P(n, k) (10 x)^{n-k} y^k$$
where $P(n, k)$, the binomial coefficient, is the kth entry on the nth row of Pascal's triangle.

To compute the root of a number C, choose a series of approximations
$$x_i^n, i = 0, 1, \ldots \text{ with } x_0 = 0$$
that satisfy $x_i^n \le C$, where the difference between $x_{i+1}$ and $x_i$ is the next digit in the approximation. The decimal fraction $y_i$ is chosen to be the largest number with a single significant digit that satisfies
$$10 x_i + y_i = 10 x_{i+1}, \text{ where } x_{i+1}^n \le C$$
then per the binomial theorem
$$(10 x_i+y)^n - (10 x_i)^n = \sum_{k=0}^{n-1} P(n, k) (10 x_i)^{n-k} y_i^k \le 10^n(C - x_i^n)$$
The term $10^n(C - x_i^n)$ is just a $10^n$ multiple of the ith remainder, $C - x_i^n$.

Using this expression, any positive principal root can be computed, digit-by-digit, as follows.

Write the original number in decimal form. The numbers are written similar to the long division algorithm, and, as in long division, the root will be written on the line above. Now separate the digits into groups of digits equating to the root being taken, starting from the decimal point and going both left and right. The decimal point of the root will be above the decimal point of the radicand. One digit of the root will appear above each group of digits of the original number.

Beginning with the left-most group of digits, do the following procedure for each group:

1. Starting on the left, bring down the most significant (leftmost) group of digits not yet used (if all the digits have been used, write "0" the number of times required to make a group) and write them to the right of the remainder from the previous step (on the first step, there will be no remainder). In other words, multiply the remainder by $10^n$ and add the digits from the next group. This will be the current value c.
2. Find p and x, as follows:
  - Let $p$ be the part of the root found so far, ignoring any decimal point. (For the first step, $p = 0$ and $0^0 = 1$).
  - Determine the greatest digit $x$ such that $y \le c$.
  - Place the digit $x$ as the next digit of the root, i.e., above the group of digits you just brought down. Thus the next p will be the old p times 10 plus x.
3. Subtract $y$ from $c$ to form a new remainder.
4. If the remainder is zero and there are no more digits to bring down, then the algorithm has terminated. Otherwise go back to step 1 for another iteration.

==== Examples ====
===== Find the square root of 152.2756 =====
For clarity, the value of the chosen digit x is in red while the current digital tally is in blue.

1	2.	3	4
01	52.	27	56	(Results)	(Explanation)
01	x = 1:	(1·10^{0}·0^{0}·1^{2} + 2·10^{1}·0^{1}·1^{1}) ≤	1	< (1·10^{0}·0^{0}·2^{2} + 2·10^{1}·0^{1}·2^{1})
01	y = 1:	y = 1·10^{0}·0^{0}·1^{2} + 2·10^{1}·0^{1}·1^{1} = 1 + 0 = 1
52.	x = 2:	(1·10^{0}·1^{0}·2^{2} + 2·10^{1}·1^{1}·2^{1}) ≤	52	< (1·10^{0}·1^{0}·3^{2} + 2·10^{1}·1^{1}·3^{1})
44.	y = 44:	y = 1·10^{0}·1^{0}·2^{2} + 2·10^{1}·1^{1}·2^{1} = 4 + 40 = 44
08.	27	x = 3:	(1·10^{0}·12^{0}·3^{2} + 2·10^{1}·12^{1}·3^{1}) ≤	827	< (1·10^{0}·12^{0}·4^{2} + 2·10^{1}·12^{1}·4^{1})
07.	29	y = 729:	y = 1·10^{0}·12^{0}·3^{2} + 2·10^{1}·12^{1}·3^{1} = 9 + 720 = 729
98	56	x = 4:	(1·10^{0}·123^{0}·4^{2} + 2·10^{1}·123^{1}·4^{1}) ≤	9856	< (1·10^{0}·123^{0}·5^{2} + 2·10^{1}·123^{1}·5^{1})
98	56	y = 9856:	y = 1·10^{0}·123^{0}·4^{2} + 2·10^{1}·123^{1}·4^{1} = 16 + 9840 = 9856
00	00.	00	00

Algorithm terminates: Answer is 12.34

===== Find the cube root of 4192 truncated to the nearest thousandth =====
1	6.	1	2	4
004	192.	000	000	000	(Results)	(Explanation)
004	x = 1:	(1·10^{0}·0^{0}·1^{3} + 3·10^{1}·0^{1}·1^{2} + 3·10^{2}·0^{2}·1^{1}) ≤	4	< (1·10^{0}·0^{0}·2^{3} + 3·10^{1}·0^{1}·2^{2} + 3·10^{2}·0^{2}·2^{1})
001	y = 1:	y = 1·10^{0}·0^{0}·1^{3} + 3·10^{1}·0^{1}·1^{2} + 3·10^{2}·0^{2}·1^{1} = 1 + 0 + 0 = 1
003	192	x = 6:	(1·10^{0}·1^{0}·6^{3} + 3·10^{1}·1^{1}·6^{2} + 3·10^{2}·1^{2}·6^{1}) ≤	3,192	< (1·10^{0}·1^{0}·7^{3} + 3·10^{1}·1^{1}·7^{2} + 3·10^{2}·1^{2}·7^{1})
003	096	y = 3,096:	y = 1·10^{0}·1^{0}·6^{3} + 3·10^{1}·1^{1}·6^{2} + 3·10^{2}·1^{2}·6^{1} = 4 + 40 = 3,096
096	000	x = 1:	(1·10^{0}·16^{0}·1^{3} + 3·10^{1}·16^{1}·1^{2} + 3·10^{2}·16^{2}·1^{1}) ≤	96,000	< (1·10^{0}·16^{0}·2^{3} + 3·10^{1}·16^{1}·2^{2} + 3·10^{2}·16^{2}·2^{1})
077	281	y = 77,281:	y = 1·10^{0}·16^{0}·1^{3} + 3·10^{1}·16^{1}·1^{2} + 3·10^{2}·16^{2}·1^{1} = 1 + 480 + 76,800 = 77,281
018	719	000	x = 2:	(1·10^{0}·161^{0}·2^{3} + 3·10^{1}·161^{1}·2^{2} + 3·10^{2}·161^{2}·2^{1}) ≤	18,719,000	< (1·10^{0}·161^{0}·3^{3} + 3·10^{1}·161^{1}·3^{2} + 3·10^{2}·161^{2}·3^{1})
015	571	928	y = 15,571,928:	y = 1·10^{0}·161^{0}·2^{3} + 3·10^{1}·161^{1}·2^{2} + 3·10^{2}·161^{2}·2^{1} = 8 + 19,320 + 15,552,600 = 15,571,928
003	147	072	000	x = 4:	(1·10^{0}·1612^{0}·4^{3} + 3·10^{1}·1612^{1}·4^{2} + 3·10^{2}·1612^{2}·4^{1}) ≤	3,147,072,000	< (1·10^{0}·1612^{0}·5^{3} + 3·10^{1}·1612^{1}·5^{2} + 3·10^{2}·1612^{2}·5^{1})

The desired precision is achieved. The cube root of 4,192 is 16.124...

=== Logarithmic calculation ===
The principal nth root of a positive number can be computed using logarithms. Starting from the equation that defines r as an nth root of x, namely $r^n=x,$ with x positive and therefore its principal root r also positive, one takes logarithms of both sides (any base of the logarithm will do) to obtain

$$n \log_b r = \log_b x \quad \quad \text{hence} \quad \quad \log_b r = \frac{\log_b x}{n}.$$

The root r is recovered from this by taking the antilog:

$$r = b^{\frac{1}{n}\log_b x}.$$

(Note: That formula shows b raised to the power of the result of the division, not b multiplied by the result of the division.)

For the case in which x is negative and n is odd, there is one real root r which is also negative. This can be found by first multiplying both sides of the defining equation by −1 to obtain $|r|^n = |x|,$ then proceeding as before to find |r|, and using r = −|r|.

== Complex roots ==
Every complex number other than 0 has n different nth roots.

=== Square roots ===
The square roots of i

The two square roots of a complex number are always negatives of each other. For example, the square roots of −4 are 2i and −2i, and the square roots of i are

$$\tfrac{1}{\sqrt{2}}(1 + i) \quad\text{and}\quad -\tfrac{1}{\sqrt{2}}(1 + i).$$

If we express a complex number in polar form, then the square root can be obtained by taking the square root of the radius and halving the angle:

$$\sqrt{re^{i\theta}} = \pm\sqrt{r} \cdot e^{i\theta/2}.$$

A principal root of a complex number may be chosen in various ways, for example

$$\sqrt{re^{i\theta}} = \sqrt{r} \cdot e^{i\theta/2}$$

which introduces a branch cut in the complex plane along the positive real axis with the condition 0 ≤ θ < 2π, or along the negative real axis with −π < θ ≤ π.

Using the first(last) branch cut the principal square root $\scriptstyle \sqrt z$ maps $\scriptstyle z$ to the half plane with non-negative imaginary(real) part. The last branch cut is presupposed in mathematical software like Matlab or Scilab.

=== Roots of unity ===
The three 3rd roots of 1

The number 1 has n different nth roots in the complex plane, namely

$$1,\;\omega,\;\omega^2,\;\ldots,\;\omega^{n-1},$$

where

$$\omega = e^\frac{2\pi i}{n} = \cos\left(\frac{2\pi}{n}\right) + i\sin\left(\frac{2\pi}{n}\right).$$

These roots are evenly spaced around the unit circle in the complex plane, at angles which are multiples of $2\pi/n$. For example, the square roots of unity are 1 and −1, and the fourth roots of unity are 1, $i$, −1, and $-i$. As a result of this symmetry, the sum of the nth roots of unity equals zero.
$$\sum_{k=0}^{n-1} e^{\frac{2\pi i}{n} k} = 0$$

=== nth roots ===
Geometric representation of the 2nd to 6th roots of a complex number z, in polar form re^{iφ} where r = |z | and φ = arg z. If z is real, φ = 0 or π. Principal roots are shown in black.

Every complex number has n different nth roots in the complex plane. These are

$$\eta,\;\eta\omega,\;\eta\omega^2,\;\ldots,\;\eta\omega^{n-1},$$

where η is a single nth root, and 1, ω, ω^{2}, ... ω^{n−1} are the nth roots of unity. Thus, since they are all just multiplied by the same scalar η, the sum of the nth roots equals zero. For example, the four different fourth roots of 2 are

$$\sqrt[4]{2},\quad i\sqrt[4]{2},\quad -\sqrt[4]{2},\quad\text{and}\quad -i\sqrt[4]{2}.$$

In polar form, a single nth root may be found from Demoivre's theorem:

$$z^\frac{1}{n} = \sqrt[n]{re^{i\theta}} = \sqrt[n]{r} \cdot e^{i\theta/n} = r^\frac{1}{n} \cdot \left( \cos\left(\frac{\theta}{n}\right) + i \sin\left(\frac{\theta}{n}\right) \right)$$

Here r is the magnitude (the modulus, also called the absolute value) of the number whose root is to be taken; if the number can be written as $a + i b$ then $r=\sqrt{a^2+b^2}$. The $\theta$ is the angle formed as one pivots on the origin counterclockwise from the positive horizontal axis to a ray going from the origin to the number; it has the properties that

$$\cos \theta = \frac{a}{r}, \sin \theta = \frac{b}{r}, \text{ and } \tan \theta = \frac{b}{a}.$$

Thus finding nth roots in the complex plane can be segmented into two steps. First, the magnitude of all the nth roots is the nth root of the magnitude of the original number. Second, the angle between the positive horizontal axis and a ray from the origin to one of the nth roots is $\theta / n$, where $\theta$ is the angle defined in the same way for the number whose root is being taken. Furthermore, all n of the nth roots are at equally spaced angles from each other, as proven by the nth root theorem

$$\sqrt[n]{r} \cdot \left( \cos\left(\frac{\theta + 2\pi k}{n}\right) + i \sin\left(\frac{\theta + 2\pi k}{n}\right) \right) \text{ for } k = 0, 1, 2, \ldots, n - 1.$$

If n is even, a complex number's nth roots, of which there are an even number, come in additive inverse pairs, so that if a number r_{1} is one of the nth roots then r_{2} = −r_{1} is another. This is because raising the latter's coefficient −1 to the nth power for even n yields 1: that is, (−r_{1})^{n} = (−1)^{n} × r_{1}^{n} = r_{1}^{n}.

As with square roots, the formula above does not define a continuous function over the entire complex plane, but instead has a branch cut at points where θ / n is discontinuous.

== Polynomial roots ==
A root of a polynomial $p(x)$ is a number $a$ such that $p(a)=0$. An nth root of a number $a$ is by definition a root of the polynomial $x^n-a$. Algebraic numbers are the numbers that are polynomial roots.

The quadratic formula expresses the roots of quadratic polynomials in terms of square roots. During the 16th century, Gerolamo Cardano and other Italian mathematicians discovered that, similarly, the roots of the polynomials of degree 3 and 4 can always be expressed in terms of nth roots (see Cubic equation and Quartic equation).

During the two next centuries, a considerable effort was devoted to the question of whether every algebraic number can be expressed in terms of radicals. In 1824, the proof of the Abel–Ruffini theorem showed that there is no general formula for the degree 5. This did not completely exclude the possibility of expressing polynomial roots in terms of radicals with formulas depending on each specific polynomial. For example, the quintic polynomial
$$p(x) = (x - a_1)(x - a_2)(x - a_3)(x - a_4)(x - a_5) = 0$$
has radical roots $a_1, a_2, ..., a_5.$ Galois theory, introduced in 1830 showed that there are polynomials of degree 5 and higher whose roots cannot be expressed in terms of radicals, the simplest example being $\textstyle x^5 - x - 1$. See Quintic function § Solvable quintics and Galois theory § A non-solvable quintic example. In summary, radicals are not always sufficient for expressing polynomial roots.

In spite of this obstacle, Demoivre's theorem demonstrates that an nth root of a number can always be extracted, even for a quintic function $x^5 - a$. The two following results, proved in the 19th century resolve fundamental problems on polynomial roots that were set in the 17th century. The fundamental theorem of algebra asserts that every polynomial has complex roots. There are numbers, called transcendental numbers that are not polynomial roots. The number π is an example of such a transcendental number.

It may be unclear why any number $a^n$ has n roots rather than just a primary root. To demonstrate this, for the principal root a of the variable x taken to the nth power, the following polynomial relation holds:
$$p(x) = x^n - a^n = 0$$
This polynomial can be factored as follows:
$$\begin{align}
p(x) & = x^n - a^n \\
& = (x-a) (x^{n-1} + a x^{n-2} + a^2 x^{n-3} + \cdots + a^{n-1}) \\
& = (x-a) \left( \sum_{k=0}^{n-1} x^{n-k-1} a^k \right) \\
\end{align}$$
Thus, the polynomial $p(x)$ is zero for x equal to a, or for any x that solves the equation:
$$\sum_{k=0}^{n-1} x^{n-k-1} a^k = 0$$
By the fundamental theorem of algebra, this series has $n-1$ roots, for a combined total of $n$.

As an example, let $n = 3$ and $a = 1$, then find the cube roots of 1

$$p(x) = x^3 - 1^3 = (x - 1) (x^2 + x^1 + 1) = 0$$

Thus the first root is $x = 1$, and the other two roots can be derived using the quadratic equation with $a = b = c = 1$

$$x = \frac{-b \pm\sqrt{b^2 - 4ac} }{2a} = \frac{-1 \pm \sqrt{1^2 - 4}}{2} = \frac{-1 \pm i\sqrt{3}}{2}$$

== Proof of irrationality for non-perfect nth power x ==
Assume that $\sqrt[n]{x}$ is rational. That is, it can be reduced to a fraction $\frac{a}{b}$, where a and b are integers without a common factor.

This means that $x = \frac{a^n}{b^n}$.

Since x is an integer, $a^n$and $b^n$must share a common factor if $b \neq 1$. This means that if $b \neq 1$, $\frac{a^n}{b^n}$ is not in simplest form. Thus b should equal 1.

Since $1^n = 1$ and $\frac{n}{1} = n$, $\frac{a^n}{b^n} = a^n$.

This means that $x = a^n$ and thus, $\sqrt[n]{x} = a$. This implies that $\sqrt[n]{x}$ is an integer. Since x is not a perfect nth power, this is impossible. Thus $\sqrt[n]{x}$ is irrational.

== See also ==
- Geometric mean
- Twelfth root of two
