= Algebraic equation =

Polynomial equation, generally univariate

In mathematics, an algebraic equation or polynomial equation is an equation of the form $P = 0$, where P is a polynomial, usually with rational numbers for coefficients.

For example, $x^5-3x+1=0$ is an algebraic equation with integer coefficients and

$$y^4 + \frac{xy}{2} - \frac{x^3}{3} + xy^2 + y^2 + \frac{1}{7} = 0$$

is a multivariate polynomial equation over the rationals. For many authors, the term algebraic equation refers only to the univariate case, that is polynomial equations that involve only one variable. On the other hand, a polynomial equation may involve several variables (the multivariate case), in which case the term polynomial equation is usually preferred.

Some but not all polynomial equations with rational coefficients have a solution that is an algebraic expression that can be found using a finite number of operations that involve only those same types of coefficients (that is, can be solved algebraically). This can be done for all such equations of degree one, two, three, or four; but for degree five or more it can only be done for some equations, not all. A large amount of research has been devoted to compute efficiently accurate approximations of the real or complex solutions of a univariate algebraic equation (see Root-finding algorithm) and of the common solutions of several multivariate polynomial equations (see System of polynomial equations).

== Terminology ==
The term "algebraic equation" dates from the time when the main problem of algebra was to solve univariate polynomial equations. This problem was completely solved during the 19th century; see Fundamental theorem of algebra, Abel–Ruffini theorem and Galois theory.

Since then, the scope of algebra has been dramatically enlarged. In particular, it includes the study of equations that involve nth roots and, more generally, algebraic expressions. This makes the term algebraic equation ambiguous outside the context of the old problem. So the term polynomial equation is generally preferred when this ambiguity may occur, specially when considering multivariate equations.

== History ==
The study of algebraic equations is probably as old as mathematics: the Babylonian mathematicians, as early as 2000 BC could solve some kinds of quadratic equations (displayed on Old Babylonian clay tablets).

Univariate algebraic equations over the rationals (i.e., with rational coefficients) have a very long history. Ancient mathematicians wanted the solutions in the form of radical expressions, like $x=\frac{1+\sqrt{5}}{2}$ for the positive solution of $x^2-x-1=0$. The ancient Egyptians knew how to solve equations of degree 2 in this manner. The Indian mathematician Brahmagupta (597–668 AD) explicitly described the quadratic formula in his treatise Brāhmasphuṭasiddhānta published in 628 AD, but written in words instead of symbols. In the 9th century Muhammad ibn Musa al-Khwarizmi and other Islamic mathematicians derived the quadratic formula, the general solution of equations of degree 2, and recognized the importance of the discriminant. During the Renaissance in 1545, Gerolamo Cardano published the solution of Scipione del Ferro and Niccolò Fontana Tartaglia to equations of degree 3 and that of Lodovico Ferrari for equations of degree 4. Finally Niels Henrik Abel proved, in 1824, that equations of degree 5 and higher do not have general solutions using radicals. Galois theory, named after Évariste Galois, showed that some equations of at least degree 5 do not even have an idiosyncratic solution in radicals, and gave criteria for deciding if an equation is in fact solvable using radicals.

== Areas of study ==
The algebraic equations are the basis of a number of areas of modern mathematics: Algebraic number theory is the study of (univariate) algebraic equations over the rationals (that is, with rational coefficients). Galois theory was introduced by Évariste Galois to specify criteria for deciding if an algebraic equation may be solved in terms of radicals. In field theory, an algebraic extension is an extension such that every element is a root of an algebraic equation over the base field. Transcendental number theory is the study of the real numbers which are not solutions to an algebraic equation over the rationals. A Diophantine equation is a (usually multivariate) polynomial equation with integer coefficients for which one is interested in the integer solutions. Algebraic geometry is the study of the solutions in an algebraically closed field of multivariate polynomial equations.

Two equations are equivalent if they have the same set of solutions. In particular the equation $P = Q$ is equivalent to $P-Q = 0$. It follows that the study of algebraic equations is equivalent to the study of polynomials.

A polynomial equation over the rationals can always be converted to an equivalent one in which the coefficients are integers. For example, multiplying through by 42 = 2·3·7 and grouping its terms in the first member, the previously mentioned polynomial equation $y^4+\frac{xy}{2}=\frac{x^3}{3}-xy^2+y^2-\frac{1}{7}$ becomes

$$42y^4+21xy-14x^3+42xy^2-42y^2+6=0.$$

Because sine, exponentiation, and 1/T are not polynomial functions,

$$e^T x^2+\frac{1}{T}xy+\sin(T)z -2 =0$$

is not a polynomial equation in the four variables x, y, z, and T over the rational numbers. However, it is a polynomial equation in the three variables x, y, and z over the field of the elementary functions in the variable T.

== Theory ==
=== Polynomials ===
Given an equation in unknown x

$$(\mathrm E) \qquad a_n x^n + a_{n - 1} x^{n - 1} + \dots + a_1 x + a_0 = 0$$,

with coefficients in a field K, one can equivalently say that the solutions of (E) in K are the roots in K of the polynomial

$$P = a_n X^n + a_{n - 1} X^{n - 1} + \dots + a_1 X + a_0 \quad \in K[X]$$.

It can be shown that a polynomial of degree n in a field has at most n roots. The equation (E) therefore has at most n solutions.

If K' is a field extension of K, one may consider (E) to be an equation with coefficients in K and the solutions of (E) in K are also solutions in K' (the converse does not hold in general). It is always possible to find a field extension of K known as the rupture field of the polynomial P, in which (E) has at least one solution.

=== Existence of solutions to real and complex equations ===
The fundamental theorem of algebra states that the field of the complex numbers is closed algebraically, that is, all polynomial equations with complex coefficients and degree at least one have a solution.

It follows that all polynomial equations of degree 1 or more with real coefficients have a complex solution. On the other hand, an equation such as $x^2 + 1 = 0$ does not have a solution in $\R$ (the solutions are the imaginary units i and −i).

While the real solutions of real equations are intuitive (they are the x-coordinates of the points where the curve y = P(x) intersects the x-axis), the existence of complex solutions to real equations can be surprising and less easy to visualize.

However, a monic polynomial of odd degree must necessarily have a real root. The associated polynomial function in x is continuous, and it approaches $-\infty$ as x approaches $-\infty$ and $+\infty$ as x approaches $+\infty$. By the intermediate value theorem, it must therefore assume the value zero at some real x, which is then a solution of the polynomial equation.

=== Connection to Galois theory ===
There exist formulas giving the solutions of real or complex polynomials of degree less than or equal to four as a function of their coefficients. Abel showed that it is not possible to find such a formula in general (using only the four arithmetic operations and taking roots) for equations of degree five or higher. Galois theory provides a criterion which allows one to determine whether the solution to a given polynomial equation can be expressed using radicals.

== Explicit solution of numerical equations ==
=== Approach ===
The explicit solution of a real or complex equation of degree 1 is trivial. Solving an equation of higher degree n reduces to factoring the associated polynomial, that is, rewriting (E) in the form

$$a_n(x-z_1)\dots(x-z_n)=0$$,

where the solutions are then the $z_1, \dots, z_n$. The problem is then to express the $z_i$ in terms of the $a_i$.

This approach applies more generally if the coefficients and solutions belong to an integral domain.

=== General techniques ===
==== Factoring ====
If an equation P(x) = 0 of degree n has a rational root α, the associated polynomial can be factored to give the form P(X) = (X − α)Q(X) (by dividing P(X) by X − α or by writing P(X) − P(α) as a linear combination of terms of the form X^{k} − α^{k}, and factoring out X − α. Solving P(x) = 0 thus reduces to solving the degree n − 1 equation Q(x) = 0. See for example the case n = 3.

==== Elimination of the sub-dominant term ====
To solve an equation of degree n,

$$(\mathrm E) \qquad a_n x^n + a_{n - 1} x^{n - 1} + \dots + a_1 x + a_0 = 0$$,

a common preliminary step is to eliminate the degree-n - 1 term: by setting $x = y-\frac{a_{n-1}}{n\,a_n}$, equation (E) becomes

$$a_ny^n + b_{n -2}y^{n -2} + \dots +b_1 y +b_0 = 0$$.

Leonhard Euler developed this technique for the case n = 3 but it is also applicable to the case n = 4, for example.

=== Quadratic equations ===
To solve a quadratic equation of the form $ax^2 + bx + c = 0$ one calculates the discriminant Δ defined by $\Delta = b^2 - 4ac$.

If the polynomial has real coefficients, it has:

- two distinct real roots if $\Delta > 0$ ;
- one real double root if $\Delta = 0$ ;
- no real root if $\Delta < 0$, but two complex conjugate roots.

=== Cubic equations ===
The best-known method for solving cubic equations, by writing roots in terms of radicals, is Cardano's formula.

=== Quartic equations ===
For detailed discussions of some solution methods see:

- Tschirnhaus transformation (general method, not guaranteed to succeed);
- Bezout method (general method, not guaranteed to succeed);
- Ferrari method (solutions for degree 4);
- Euler method (solutions for degree 4);
- Lagrange method (solutions for degree 4);
- Descartes method (solutions for degree 2 or 4);

A quartic equation $ax^4+bx^3+cx^2+dx+e=0$ with $a\ne0$ may be reduced to a quadratic equation by a change of variable provided it is either biquadratic (b = d = 0) or quasi-palindromic (e = a, d = b).

Some cubic and quartic equations can be solved using trigonometry or hyperbolic functions.

=== Higher-degree equations ===
Évariste Galois and Niels Henrik Abel showed independently that in general a polynomial of degree 5 or higher is not solvable using radicals. Some particular equations do have solutions, such as those associated with the cyclotomic polynomials of degrees 5 and 17.

Charles Hermite, on the other hand, showed that polynomials of degree 5 are solvable using elliptical functions.

Otherwise, one may find numerical approximations to the roots using root-finding algorithms, such as Newton's method.

== See also ==
- Algebraic function
- Algebraic number
- Root finding
- Linear equation (degree = 1)
- Quadratic equation (degree = 2)
- Cubic equation (degree = 3)
- Quartic equation (degree = 4)
- Quintic equation (degree = 5)
- Sextic equation (degree = 6)
- Septic equation (degree = 7)
- System of linear equations
- System of polynomial equations
- Linear Diophantine equation
- Linear equation over a ring
- Cramer's theorem (algebraic curves), on the number of points usually sufficient to determine a bivariate n-th degree curve
