= Solution in radicals =

Solution in radicals of a polynomial equation

A solution in radicals or algebraic solution is an expression of a solution of a polynomial equation that is algebraic, that is, relies only on addition, subtraction, multiplication, division, raising to integer powers, and extraction of nth roots (square roots, cube roots, etc.).

A well-known example is the quadratic formula
$$x=\frac{-b \pm \sqrt {b^2-4ac\  }}{2a},$$
which expresses the solutions of the quadratic equation
$$ax^2 + bx + c =0.$$

There exist algebraic solutions for cubic equations and quartic equations, which are more complicated than the quadratic formula. The Abel–Ruffini theorem, and, more generally Galois theory, state that some quintic equations, such as
$$x^5-x+1=0,$$
do not have any algebraic solution. The same is true for every higher degree. However, for any degree there are some polynomial equations that have algebraic solutions; for example, the equation $x^{10} = 2$ can be solved as $x=\pm\sqrt[10]2.$ The eight other solutions are nonreal complex numbers, which are also algebraic and have the form $x=\pm r\sqrt[10]2,$ where r is a fifth root of unity, which can be expressed with two nested square roots. See also Quintic function § Other solvable quintics for various other examples in degree 5.

Évariste Galois introduced a criterion allowing one to decide which equations are solvable in radicals. See Radical extension for the precise formulation of his result.

== See also ==
- Radical symbol
- Solvable quintics
- Solvable sextics
- Solvable septics
