= Radical extension =

Mathematical field obtained by adjunction of nth roots

In mathematics and more specifically in field theory, a radical extension of a field $K$ is a field extension obtained by a tower of field extensions, each generated by adjoining an nth root of an element from the previous field.

== Definition ==
A simple radical extension is a simple extension F/K generated by a single element $\alpha$ satisfying $\alpha^n = b$ for an element b of K. In characteristic p, we also take an extension by a root of an Artin–Schreier polynomial to be a simple radical extension. A radical series is a tower $K = F_0 < F_1 < \cdots < F_k$ where each extension $F_i / F_{i-1}$ is a simple radical extension. In this case, the field extension $F_k/K$ is called a radical extension.

== Properties ==
1. If E is a radical extension of F and F is a radical extension of K, then E is a radical extension of K.
2. If E and F are radical extensions of K in an extension field C of K, then the compositum EF (the smallest subfield of C that contains both E and F) is a radical extension of K.
3. If E is a radical extension of F and E > K > F then E is a radical extension of K.

== Solvability by radicals ==
Radical extensions occur naturally when solving polynomial equations in radicals. In fact a solution in radicals is the expression of the solution as an element of a radical series: a polynomial f over a field K is said to be solvable by radicals if there is a splitting field of f over K contained in a radical extension of K.

The Abel–Ruffini theorem states that such a solution by radicals does not exist, in general, for equations of degree at least five. Évariste Galois showed that an equation is solvable in radicals if and only if its Galois group is solvable. The proof is based on the fundamental theorem of Galois theory and the following theorem.

Let K be a field containing n distinct nth roots of unity. An extension of K of degree n is a radical extension generated by an nth root of an element of K if and only if it is a Galois extension whose Galois group is a cyclic group of order n.

The proof is related to Lagrange resolvents. Let $\omega$ be a primitive nth root of unity (belonging to K). If the extension is generated by $\alpha$ with $x^n-a$ as a minimal polynomial, the mapping $\alpha\mapsto \omega\alpha$ induces a K-automorphism of the extension that generates the Galois group, showing the "only if" implication. Conversely, if $\phi$ is a K-automorphism generating the Galois group, and $\beta$ is a generator of the extension, let

$$\alpha=\sum_{i=0}^{n-1}\omega^{-i}\phi^i(\beta).$$

The relation $\phi(\alpha) = \omega\alpha$ implies that the product of the conjugates of $\alpha$ (that is the images of $\alpha$ by the K-automorphisms) belongs to K, and is equal to the product of $\alpha^n$ by the product of the nth roots of unit. As the product of the nth roots of units is $\pm 1$, this implies that $\alpha^n\in K,$ and thus that the extension is a radical extension.

It follows from this theorem that a Galois extension may be extended to a radical extension if and only if its Galois group is solvable (but there are non-radical Galois extensions whose Galois group is solvable, for example $\mathbb{Q}(\cos(2\pi/7))/\mathbb{Q}$). This is, in modern terminology, the criterion of solvability by radicals that was provided by Galois. The proof uses the fact that the Galois closure of a simple radical extension of degree n is the extension of it by a primitive nth root of unity, and that the Galois group of the nth roots of unity is cyclic.
