= Septic =

Septic may refer to:

- Septic shock, a medical condition
- Septic tank or septic system, a component of a small scale sewage disposal system
- Septic equation, a polynomial of degree seven
- Slang term for "American" in the Cockney dialect

== See also ==
- Sepsis
- Aseptic
- Antiseptic
