= Topological Galois theory =

In mathematics, topological Galois theory is a mathematical theory which originated from a topological proof of Abel's impossibility theorem found by Vladimir Arnold and concerns the applications of some topological concepts to some problems in the field of Galois theory. It connects many ideas from algebra to ideas in topology. As described in Askold Khovanskii's book: "According to this theory, the way the Riemann surface of an analytic function covers the plane of complex numbers can obstruct the representability of this function by explicit formulas. The strongest known results on the unexpressibility of functions by explicit formulas have been obtained in this way."
