= Rupture field =

Algebraic concept

In abstract algebra, a rupture field of a polynomial $P(X)$ over a given field $K$ is a field extension of $K$ generated by a root $a$ of $P(X)$.

For instance, if $K=\mathbb Q$ and $P(X)=X^3-2$ then $\mathbb Q[\sqrt[3]2]$ is a rupture field for $P(X)$.

The notion is interesting mainly if $P(X)$ is irreducible over $K$. In that case, all rupture fields of $P(X)$ over $K$ are isomorphic, non-canonically, to $K_P=K[X]/(P(X))$: if $L=K[a]$ where $a$ is a root of $P(X)$, then the ring homomorphism $f$ defined by $f(k)=k$ for all $k\in K$ and $f(X\bmod P)=a$ is an isomorphism. Also, in this case the degree of the extension equals the degree of $P$.

A rupture field of a polynomial does not necessarily contain all the roots of that polynomial: in the above example the field $\mathbb Q[\sqrt[3]2]$ does not contain the other two (complex) roots of $P(X)$ (namely $\omega\sqrt[3]2$ and $\omega^2\sqrt[3]2$ where $\omega$ is a primitive cube root of unity). For a field containing all the roots of a polynomial, see Splitting field.

== Examples ==
A rupture field of $X^2+1$ over $\mathbb R$ is $\mathbb C$. It is also a splitting field.

The rupture field of $X^2+1$ over $\mathbb F_3$ is $\mathbb F_9$ since there is no element of $\mathbb F_3$ which squares to $-1$ (and all quadratic extensions of $\mathbb F_3$ are isomorphic to $\mathbb F_9$).
