= C. V. Mourey =

French mathematician

C.V. Mourey
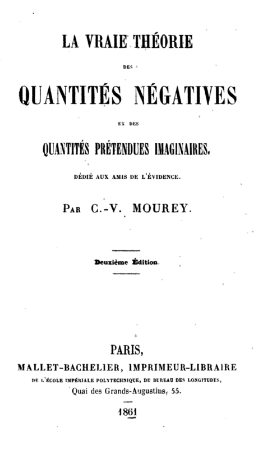
- Front page of the second edition (1861)
- Born: may be 1791 may be Valay, France
- Died: may be 1830 may be Paris, France
- Scientific career
- Fields: Mathematics

C. V. Mourey (1791? – 1830?) was a French mathematician who wrote a work of 100 pages titled La vraie théorie des quantités négatives et des quantités prétendues imaginaires (The true theory of negative quantities and of alleged imaginary quantities), published in Paris in 1828 and reedited in 1861, in which he gave a systematic presentation of vector theory. He seems to be the first mathematician to state the necessity of specifying the conditions of equality between vectors.

Mourey also stated that there exists a more general algebra but no other writings by him have survived.

Nothing is known about Mourey's life. The St. Andrews University's researcher Elizabeth Lewis, supposes Mourey was a technician in Paris, but says she cannot positively identify him.

== Bibliography ==
- Crowe, Michael J. (1994). A History of Vector Analysis: The Evolution of the Idea of a Vectorial System. New York: Dover. ISBN 0-486-67910-1.
- Schubring, Gert (2005). Conflicts Between Generalization, Rigor, and Intuition. Springer. ISBN 978-0387-22836-5.
- Windred, G. (1929). "History of the Theory of Imaginary and Complex Quantities". The Mathematical Gazette. 14 (203): 533–541. doi:10.2307/3606116. ISSN 0025-5572. JSTOR 3606116. S2CID 125148520.
