= Valay =

- Commune
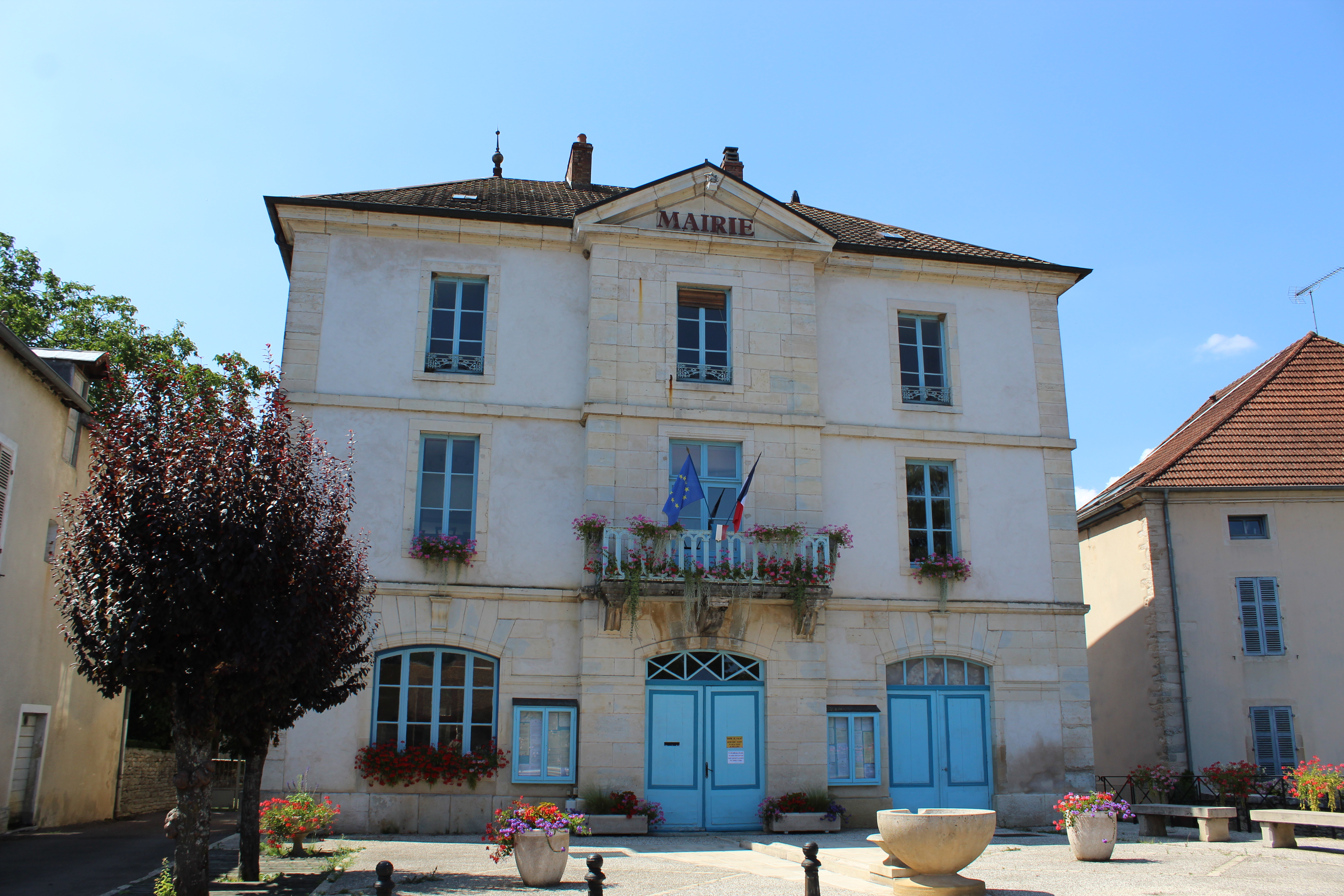
- The town hall in Valay
- Location of Valay
- Location within France Location within Bourgogne-Franche-Comté
- Coordinates: 47°20′21″N 5°38′23″E
- Country: France
- Region: Bourgogne-Franche-Comté
- Department: Haute-Saône
- Arrondissement: Vesoul
- Canton: Marnay

Government
  - Mayor (2020–2026): Claudie Gauthier
- Area^{1}: 17.40 km^{2} (6.72 sq mi)
- Highest elevation: 266 m (873 ft)
- Lowest elevation: 206 m (676 ft)
- Population (2023): 638
  - Density: 36.7/km^{2} (95.0/sq mi)
- Time zone: UTC+01:00 (CET)
  - Summer (DST): UTC+02:00 (CEST)
- INSEE/Postal code: 70514 /70140
- ^{1} French Land Register data, which excludes lakes, ponds, glaciers > 1 km^{2} (0.386 sq mi or 247 acres) and river estuaries.

Valay (French pronunciation: [valɛ]) is a commune in the Haute-Saône department in the region of Bourgogne-Franche-Comté in eastern France.

== See also ==
- Communes of the Haute-Saône department
