= List of things named after Niels Henrik Abel =

This is the list of things named after Niels Henrik Abel (1802–1829), a Norwegian mathematician.

== Mathematics ==
- Abel's binomial theorem
- Abel elliptic functions
- Abel equation
- Abel equation of the first kind
- Abel–Goncharov interpolation
- Abel–Plana formula
- Abel function
- Abel's integral equation
- Abel's identity
- Abel's inequality
- Abel's irreducibility theorem
- Abel–Jacobi map
  - Abel–Jacobi theorem
- Abel polynomials
- Abel's summation formula
  - Abelian means
- Abel's test
- Abel's theorem
  - Abelian theorem
- Abel–Ruffini theorem
- Abel transform
- Abel transformation
- Abelian category
  - Pre-abelian category
  - Quasi-abelian category
- Abelian group
  - Abelianization
  - Metabelian group
  - Non-abelian group
- Abelian extension
- Abelian integral
- Abelian surface
- Abelian variety
  - Abelian variety of CM-type
  - Dual abelian variety
- Abelian von Neumann algebra

== Geography ==
- Abeltoppen, a mountain in Dickson Land at Spitsbergen, Svalbard.
- Rue Abel, a street in the 12th arrondissement of Paris in front of the Gare de Lyon mainline station.

== Other ==
- Abel, a lunar crater
- Abel Prize
