= Abel's sum formula =

Abel's sum formula may refer to:

- Abel's summation formula, a formula used in number theory to compute series
- Summation by parts, a transformation of the summation of products of sequences into other summations
