= Abel's theorem =

Power series theorem in mathematics

In mathematics, Abel's theorem for power series relates a limit of a power series to the sum of its coefficients. It is named after Norwegian mathematician Niels Henrik Abel, who proved it in 1826.

== Theorem ==
Let the Taylor series
$$G (x) = \sum_{k=0}^\infty a_k x^k$$
be a power series with real coefficients $a_k$. Suppose that the series
$$\sum_{k=0}^\infty a_k$$
converges. Then $G(x)$ is continuous from the left at $x = 1,$ that is,
$$\lim_{x\to 1^-} G(x) = \sum_{k=0}^\infty a_k.$$

The same theorem holds for complex power series
$$G(z) = \sum_{k=0}^\infty a_k z^k,$$
provided that $z \to 1$ entirely within a single Stolz sector, that is, a region of the open unit disk where
$$|1-z| \leq M(1-|z|)$$
for some fixed finite $M > 1$. Without this restriction, the limit may fail to exist: for example, the power series
$$\sum_{n>0} \frac{z^{3^n}-z^{2\cdot 3^n}} n$$
converges to $0$ at $z = 1,$ but is unbounded near any other point of the form $e^{\pi i/3^n},$ so the value at $z = 1$ is not the limit as $z$ tends to 1 in the whole open disk.

The convergence of $\sum_{k=0}^\infty a_k$ implies that the radius of convergence of the power series $\sum_{k=0}^{\infty} a_k z^k$ is at least 1, ensuring convergence for $|z|<1$.

Also, by the uniform limit theorem, $G(z)$ is continuous on the real closed interval $[0, t]$ for $t < 1,$ by virtue of the uniform convergence of the series on compact subsets of the disk of convergence (by the Weierstrass M-test). Abel's theorem allows us to say more, namely that the restriction of $G(z)$ to $[0, 1]$ is continuous.

=== Stolz sector ===
20 Stolz sectors, for $M$ ranging from 1.01 to 10. The red lines are the tangents to the cone at the right end.

The Stolz sector $|1-z|\leq M(1-|z|)$ has explicit equation
$$y^2 = -\frac{M^4 (x^2 - 1) - 2 M^2 ((x - 1) x + 1) + 2 \sqrt{M^4 (-2 M^2 (x - 1) + 2 x - 1)} + (x - 1)^2}{(M^2 - 1)^2}$$
and is plotted on the right for various values.

The left end of the sector is $x = \frac{1-M}{1+M}$, and the right end is $x=1$. On the right end, it becomes a cone with angle $2\theta$ where $\cos\theta = \frac{1}{M}$.

== Remarks ==
As an immediate consequence of this theorem, if $z$ is any nonzero complex number for which the series
$$\sum_{k=0}^\infty a_k z^k$$
converges, then it follows that
$$\lim_{t\to 1^{-}} G(tz) = \sum_{k=0}^\infty a_kz^k$$
in which the limit is taken from below.

The theorem can also be generalized to account for sums which diverge to infinity; see below. If
$$\sum_{k=0}^\infty a_k = \infty$$
then
$$\lim_{x \to 1^{-}} G(x) \to \infty.$$

However, if the series is only known to be divergent, but for reasons other than diverging to infinity, then the claim of the theorem may fail: take, for example, the power series for
$$\frac{1}{1+z}.$$

At $z = 1$ the series is equal to $1 - 1 + 1 - 1 + \cdots,$ but $\tfrac{1}{1+1} = \tfrac{1}{2}.$

We also remark the theorem holds for radii of convergence other than $R = 1$: let
$$G(x) = \sum_{k=0}^\infty a_kx^k$$
be a power series with radius of convergence $R > 0,$ and suppose the series converges at $x = R.$ Then $G(x)$ is continuous from the left at $x = R,$ that is,
$$\lim_{x\to R^-}G(x) = G(R).$$

== Applications ==
Abel's theorem allows us to evaluate many series in closed form if we can first prove that they converge. For example, consider the sequence
$$a_k = \frac{(-1)^k}{k+1}.$$
The sum $\sum_{k=0}^\infty a_k$ converges by the alternating series test, so we can apply Abel's theorem to the corresponding generating function $G_a(z)$. We obtain
$$G_a(z) = \frac{\ln(1+z)}{z}, \qquad 0 < z < 1,$$
by integrating the uniformly convergent geometric power series term by term on $[-z, 0]$; thus the series
$$\sum_{k=0}^\infty \frac{(-1)^k}{k+1}$$
converges to $\lim \limits_{z \to 1^-} G_a(z) = \ln 2$ by Abel's theorem. Similarly,
$$\sum_{k=0}^\infty \frac{(-1)^k}{2k+1}$$
converges to $\arctan 1 = \tfrac{\pi}{4}.$

$G_a(z)$ is called the generating function of the sequence $a.$ Abel's theorem is frequently useful in dealing with generating functions of real-valued and non-negative sequences, such as probability-generating functions. In particular, it is useful in the theory of Galton–Watson processes.

== Outline of proof ==
Let $S = \sum_{k=0}^\infty a_k$ and $s_n= \left({\sum_{k=0}^n a_k}\right) - S\!.$ Then substituting $a_k=s_k-s_{k-1}$ and performing a simple manipulation of the series (summation by parts) results in
$$G_a(z) = S + (1-z)\sum_{k=0}^{\infty} s_k z^k.$$

Given $\varepsilon > 0,$ pick $n$ large enough so that $|s_k| < \varepsilon$ for all $k \geq n.$ We have
$$\left|(1-z)\sum_{k=n}^\infty s_kz^k \right| \leq \varepsilon |1-z|\sum_{k=n}^\infty |z|^k = \varepsilon|1-z|\frac{|z|^n}{1-|z|} < \varepsilon M$$
when $z$ lies within the given Stolz angle. Whenever $z$ is sufficiently close to $1$ we have
$$\left|(1-z)\sum_{k=0}^{n-1} s_kz^k \right| < \varepsilon,$$
so that $\left|G_a(z) - S\right| < (M+1) \varepsilon$ when $z$ is both sufficiently close to $1$ and within the Stolz angle.

== Divergent case ==
To prove the case for $\sum_{k=0}^\infty a_k = +\infty$, let $x \in (0,1)$ and $s_n = \sum_{k=0}^n a_k$. Since $(s_k)_k$ diverges to $+\infty$, we can find, for any $M \in \mathbb{R}_+$, a $N \in \N$ such that $s_k > 3M$ for all $k \geq N$. We write, for $n > N$:
$$\sum_{k=0}^n a_k x^k = \left[{(1-x) \sum_{k=0}^{N-1} s_k x^k}\right] + \left\{{ (1-x) \left[{ \sum_{k=N}^{n-1} s_k x^k }\right] + s_n x^n }\right\}$$
Since the first term on the right hand side vanishes as $x \to 1$, we can find an $x_1 \in (0, 1)$ such that it exceeds $-M$ whenever $x_1 < x < 1$. The second term may be estimated by:
$$(1-x) \left[{ \sum_{k=N}^{n-1} s_k x^k }\right] + s_n x^n > 3M \left\{{ (1-x) \left[{\sum_{k=N}^{n-1} x^k}\right] + x^n}\right\} = 3M x^N.$$
Hence, if we let $x_2 = (2/3)^{1/N}$, then for $x_2 < x < 1$ this exceeds $2M$. Combining, we get, for any $n>N$ and $\max(x_1, x_2) < x < 1$:
$$\sum_{k=0}^n a_k x^k > M.$$
This establishes:
$$\lim_{x \to 1^{-}} \liminf_{n \to \infty} \sum_{k=0}^n a_k x^k = +\infty$$

In the absence of additional assumptions, the series $\sum_{k=0}^{\infty} a_k x^k$ might not converge when $|x|<1$, hence the use of the limit inferior.

== Related concepts ==
Converses to a theorem like Abel's are called Tauberian theorems: There is no exact converse, but results conditional on some hypothesis. The field of divergent series, and their summation methods, contains many theorems of abelian type and of tauberian type.

== Generalizations ==
In the real case, the functions $x^k$ may be replaced by bounded non-negative functions $u_k(x)$ monotonically decreasing with $k$ (i.e., $u_k(x) \ge u_{k+1}(x)$) such that $\lim_{x \to 1^{-}} u_k(x) = 1$ for all $k$. This follows from Abel's uniform convergence test and applying the uniform limit theorem.

== See also ==
- Abel's summation formula – Integration by parts version of Abel's method for summation by parts
- Nachbin resummation – Theorem bounding the growth rate of analytic functions
- Summation by parts – Theorem to simplify sums of products of sequences
