= Kronecker substitution =

Kronecker substitution is a technique named after Leopold Kronecker for determining the coefficients of an unknown polynomial by evaluating it at a single value. If p(x) is a polynomial with integer coefficients, and x is chosen to be both a power of two and larger in magnitude than any of the coefficients of p, then the coefficients of each term of can be read directly out of the binary representation of p(x).

One application of this method is to reduce the computational problem of multiplying polynomials to the (potentially simpler) problem of multiplying integers. If p(x) and q(x) are polynomials with known coefficients, then one can use these coefficients to determine a value of x that is a large enough power of two for the coefficients of the product pq(x) to be able to be read off from the binary representation of the number p(x)q(x). Since p(x) and q(x) are themselves straightforward to determine from the coefficients of p and q, this result shows that polynomial multiplication may be performed in the time of a single binary multiplication.

Let n be the maximum of the degrees of p and q. A sufficient bound can be obtained from the fact that every coefficient in the product is a sum of at most n products of pairs of coefficients, with the first in the pair from p and the second from q. Let a and b be the largest (in magnitude) coefficients of p and q respectively. Then all coefficients of pq cannot be larger than n a b. Thus, by adding the number of bits of n, a, and b, we will get a suitable power.

== See also ==
- Kronecker product
