= Hugo Kronecker =

German physiologist

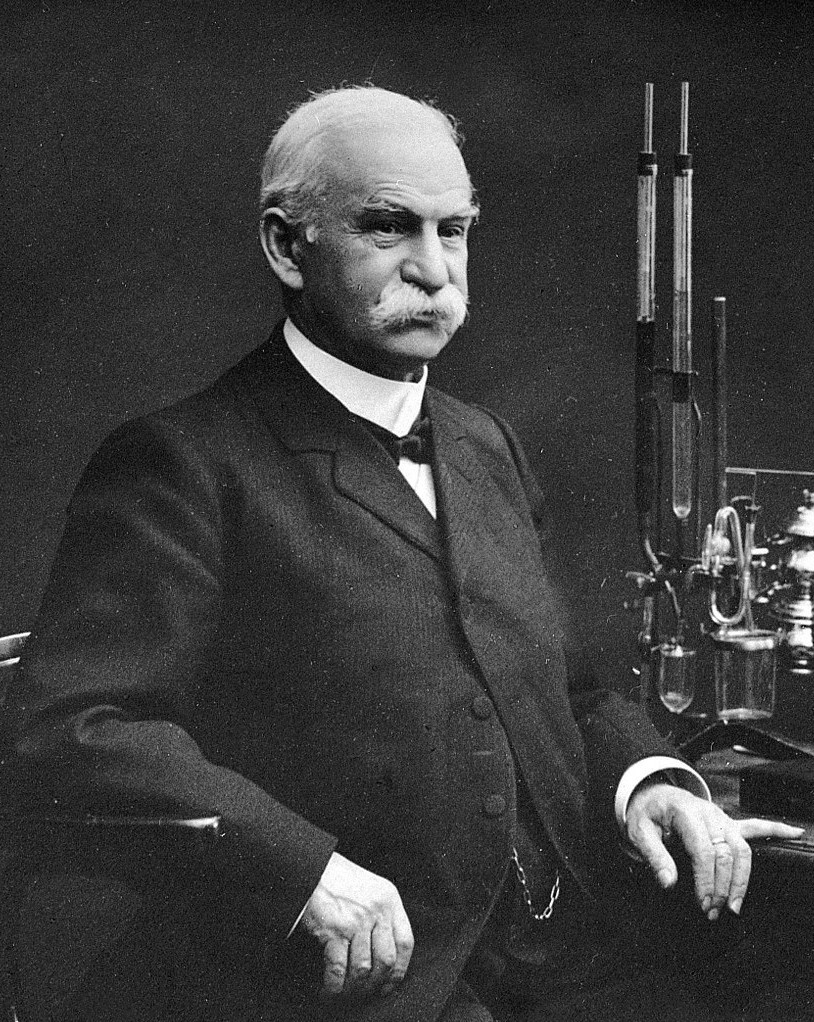
Hugo Kronecker in 1909

Karl Hugo Kronecker (27 January 1839 – 6 June 1914) was a German physiologist from Liegnitz, Prussian Silesia. He was the brother of Leopold Kronecker.

He studied medicine in Berlin, Heidelberg and Pisa, and received the M.D. degree in Berlin. From 1868, he worked in the Leipzig Physiological Institute, (later known as Carl Ludwig Institute of Physiology with Carl Ludwig. He received habilitation (permission to lecture) in 1872 with a thesis on fatigue and recovery of skeletal muscles.

In 1878, he moved to Berlin to become department director in the Physiological Institute. In 1885, he was appointed chairman of Physiology at the University of Bern, Switzerland. There he built a new Institute of Physiology.

Kronecker received the honorary Doctor of Laws (LL.D) from the University of Glasgow in June 1901.

He died in Bad Nauheim.

Hugo Kronecker and his learner Samuel James Meltzer were the first, who studied (in 1883) oesophageal manometry in humans.
