= Leopold Kronecker =

German mathematician (1823–1891)

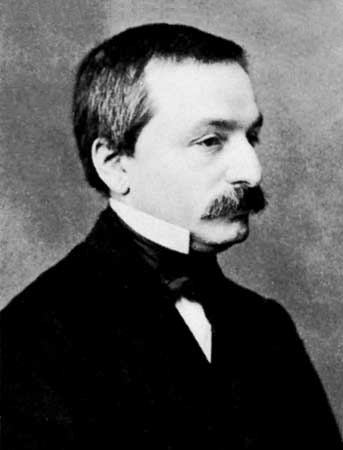
- Kronecker in 1865
- Born: 7 December 1823; Liegnitz, Province of Silesia, Prussia
- Died: 29 December 1891 (aged 68); Berlin, German Empire
- Citizenship: Prussian
- Education: University of Berlin
- Known for: Arithmetization of analysis; Kronecker delta; Kronecker foliations; Kronecker limit formula; Kronecker symbol; Kronecker product; Kronecker quiver; Kronecker substitution; Kronecker's congruence; Kronecker's Jugendtraum; Kronecker's lemma; Kronecker's theorem; Kronecker–Capelli theorem; Kronecker–Weber theorem; Hermite–Kronecker–Brioschi characterization
- Awards: ForMemRS (1884)
- Scientific career
- Fields: Mathematics; Logic
- Workplaces: Berlin Academy; University of Berlin
- Doctoral advisor: Johann Encke; Peter Gustav Lejeune Dirichlet
- Doctoral students: Kurt Hensel; Adolf Kneser; Ernst Kötter; Mathias Lerch; Franz Mertens; Jules Molk; Paul Stäckel

Leopold Kronecker (German: [ˈkʁoːnɛkɐ]; 7 December 1823 – 29 December 1891) was a German mathematician who worked on number theory, abstract algebra and logic, and criticized Georg Cantor's work on set theory. Heinrich Weber quoted Kronecker as having said, "Die ganzen Zahlen hat der liebe Gott gemacht, alles andere ist Menschenwerk" ("God made the integers, all else is the work of man"). Kronecker was a student and life-long friend of Ernst Kummer.

== Biography ==
Leopold Kronecker was born on 7 December 1823 in Liegnitz, Prussia (now Legnica, Poland) in a wealthy Jewish family. His parents, Isidor and Johanna (née Prausnitzer), took care of their children's education and provided them with private tutoring at home –Leopold's younger brother Hugo Kronecker would also follow a scientific path, later becoming a notable physiologist. Kronecker then went to the Liegnitz Gymnasium where he was interested in a wide range of topics including science, history and philosophy, while also practicing gymnastics and swimming. At the gymnasium he was taught by Ernst Kummer, who noticed and encouraged the boy's interest in mathematics.

In 1841 Kronecker became a student at the University of Berlin where his interest did not immediately focus on mathematics, but rather spread over several subjects including astronomy and philosophy. He spent the summer of 1843 at the University of Bonn studying astronomy and 1843–44 at the University of Breslau following his former teacher Kummer. Back in Berlin, Kronecker studied mathematics with Peter Gustav Lejeune Dirichlet and in 1845 defended his dissertation in algebraic number theory written under Dirichlet's supervision.

After obtaining his degree, Kronecker did not follow his interest in research on an academic career path. He went back to his hometown to manage a large farming estate built up by his mother's uncle, a former banker. In 1848 he married his cousin Fanny Prausnitzer, and the couple had six children. For several years Kronecker focused on business, and although he continued to study mathematics as a hobby and corresponded with Kummer, he published no mathematical results. In 1853 he wrote a memoir on the algebraic solvability of equations extending the work of Évariste Galois on the theory of equations.

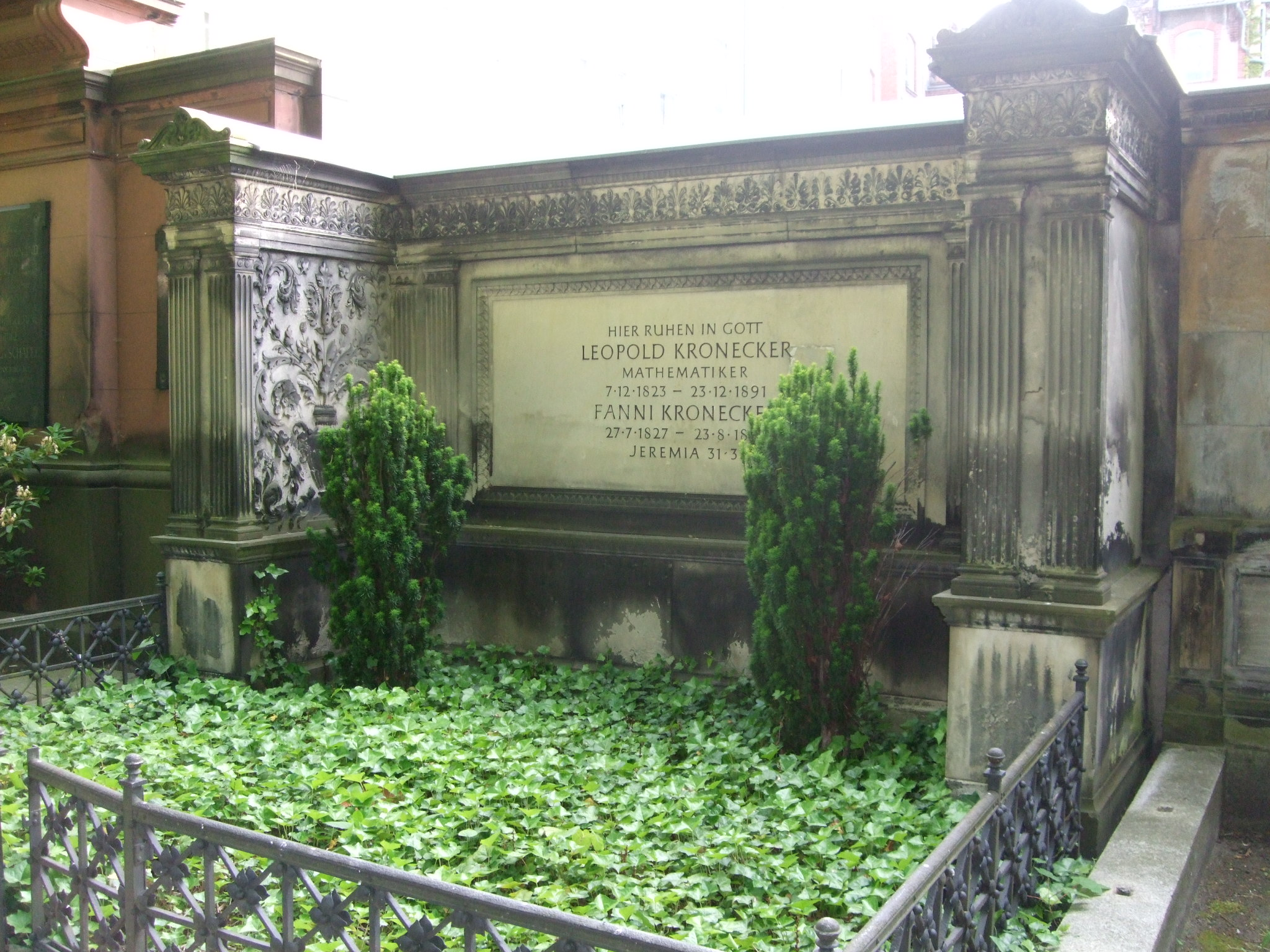
Grave of Kronecker (St Matthäus, Berlin)

Due to his business activity, Kronecker was financially comfortable, and thus he could return to Berlin in 1855 to pursue mathematics as a private scholar. Dirichlet, whose wife Rebecka came from the wealthy Mendelssohn family, had introduced Kronecker to the Berlin elite. He became a close friend of Karl Weierstrass, who had recently joined the university, and his former teacher Kummer who had just taken over Dirichlet's mathematics chair. Over the following years Kronecker published numerous papers resulting from his previous years' independent research. As a result of this published research, he was elected a member of the Berlin Academy in 1861.

Although he held no official university position, Kronecker had the right as a member of the Academy to hold classes at the University of Berlin and he decided to do so, starting in 1862. In 1866, when Riemann died, Kronecker was offered the mathematics chair at the University of Göttingen (previously held by Carl Friedrich Gauss and Dirichlet), but he refused, preferring to keep his position at the Academy. Only in 1883, when Kummer retired from the university, was Kronecker invited to succeed him and became an ordinary professor. Kronecker was the supervisor of Kurt Hensel, Adolf Kneser, Mathias Lerch, and Franz Mertens, amongst others.

His philosophical view of mathematics put him in conflict with several mathematicians over the years, notably straining his relationship with Weierstrass, who almost decided to leave the university in 1888. Kronecker died on 29 December 1891 in Berlin, several months after the death of his wife. In the last year of his life, he converted to Christianity. He is buried in the Alter St Matthäus Kirchhof cemetery in Berlin-Schöneberg, close to Gustav Kirchhoff.

== Scientific activity ==
=== Mathematics research ===
An important part of Kronecker's research focused on number theory and algebra. In an 1853 paper on the theory of equations and Galois theory he formulated the Kronecker–Weber theorem, without however offering a definitive proof (the theorem was proved completely much later by David Hilbert). He also introduced the structure theorem for finitely generated abelian groups. Kronecker studied elliptic functions and conjectured his "liebster Jugendtraum" ("dearest dream of youth"), a generalization that was later put forward by Hilbert in a modified form as his twelfth problem. In an 1850 paper, On the Solution of the General Equation of the Fifth Degree, Kronecker solved the quintic equation by applying group theory (though his solution was not in terms of radicals: that was already proven impossible by the Abel–Ruffini theorem).

In algebraic number theory Kronecker introduced the theory of divisors as an alternative to Dedekind's theory of ideals, which he did not find acceptable for philosophical reasons. Although the general adoption of Dedekind's approach led Kronecker's theory to be ignored for a long time, his divisors were found useful and were revived by several mathematicians in the 20th century.

Kronecker also contributed to the concept of continuity, reconstructing the form of irrational numbers in real numbers. In analysis, Kronecker rejected the formulation of a continuous, nowhere differentiable function by his colleague, Karl Weierstrass.

Also named for Kronecker are the Kronecker limit formula, Kronecker's congruence, Kronecker delta, Kronecker comb, Kronecker symbol, Kronecker product, Kronecker's method for factorizing polynomials, Kronecker substitution, Kronecker's theorem in number theory, Kronecker's lemma, and Eisenstein–Kronecker numbers.

=== Philosophy of mathematics ===
Kronecker's finitism made him a forerunner of intuitionism in foundations of mathematics.

== Honors ==
Kronecker was elected as a member of several academies:

- Prussian Academy of Sciences (1861)
- French Academy of Sciences (1868)
- Royal Society (1884).

The 25624 Kronecker asteroid is named after him.

== Publications ==
- Kronecker, Leopold (1978) [1901], Vorlesungen über Zahlentheorie, Berlin, New York: Springer-Verlag, ISBN 978-3-540-08277-4, MR 0529431
- Kronecker, Leopold (1968) [1895], Hensel, Kurt (ed.), Leopold Kronecker's Werke. Bände I–V, New York: Chelsea Publishing Co., ISBN 978-0-8284-0224-8, MR 0237286
