= Abel's inequality =

In mathematics, Abel's inequality, named after Niels Henrik Abel, supplies a simple bound on the absolute value of the inner product of two vectors in an important special case.

== Mathematical description ==
Let {a_{1}, a_{2},...} be a sequence of real numbers that is either nonincreasing or nondecreasing, and let {b_{1}, b_{2},...} be a sequence of real or complex numbers. If {a_{n}} is nondecreasing, it holds that

$$\left |\sum_{k=1}^n a_k b_k \right | \le \operatorname{max}_{k=1,\dots,n} |B_k| (|a_n| + a_n - a_1),$$

and if {a_{n}} is nonincreasing, it holds that

$$\left |\sum_{k=1}^n a_k b_k \right | \le \operatorname{max}_{k=1,\dots,n} |B_k| (|a_n| - a_n + a_1),$$

where

$$B_k =b_1+\cdots+b_k.$$

In particular, if the sequence {a_{n}} is nonincreasing and nonnegative, it follows that

$$\left |\sum_{k=1}^n a_k b_k \right | \le \operatorname{max}_{k=1,\dots,n} |B_k| a_1,$$

== Relation to Abel's transformation ==
Abel's inequality follows easily from Abel's transformation, which is the discrete version of integration by parts: If {a_{1}, a_{2}, ...} and {b_{1}, b_{2}, ...} are sequences of real or complex numbers, it holds that

$$\sum_{k=1}^n a_k b_k = a_n B_n - \sum_{k=1}^{n-1} B_k (a_{k+1} - a_k).$$
