= Ernst Kötter =

German mathematician

- Born: 7 August 1859; Berlin, Kingdom of Prussia
- Died: 26 January 1922 (aged 62); Aachen, Rhine Province, Free State of Prussia, Germany
- Education: University of Berlin
- Awards: Prize of the Berlin Royal Academy (1886)
- Scientific career
- Fields: Mathematician
- Thesis: Zur Theorie der Osculationen bei ebenen Curven 3. Ordnung (1884)
- Academic advisors: Karl Weierstrass; Leopold Kronecker

Ernst Kötter (1859-1922) was a German mathematician.

== Education ==
Kötter graduated in 1884 from the University of Berlin under the supervision of Karl Weierstrass and Leopold Kronecker.

== Career ==
Kötter's treatise "Fundamentals of a purely geometrical theory of algebraic plane curves" gained the 1886 prize of the Berlin Royal Academy.

In 1901, he published his report on "The development of synthetic geometry from Monge to Staudt (1847)"; it had been sent to the press as early as 1897, but completion was deferred by Kötter's appointment to Aachen University and a subsequent persisting illness. He constructed a mobile wood model to illustrate the theorems of Dandelin spheres.

In a discussion with Schoenflies and Kötter, Hilbert reportedly uttered his famous quotation according to which points, lines, and planes in geometry could be named as well "tables, chairs, and beer mugs".

== Publications ==
- Ernst Kötter (Jun 1884). Beiträge zur Theorie der Osculationen bei ebenen Curven dritter Ordnung (Ph.D.). Friedrich-Wilhelms-Universität Berlin. Archived from the original on 2016-03-04.
- Ernst Kötter (1887). "Grundzüge einer rein geometrischen Theorie der algebraischen ebenen Kurven". Royal Academy of Berlin.
- Ernst Kötter (Oct 1888). "Die Hesse'sche Curve in rein geometrischer Behandlung". Mathematische Annalen. 34: 123–149. doi:10.1007/bf01446793. S2CID 119585670.
- Ernst Kötter (1891). "Einige Hauptsätze aus der Lehre von den Curven dritter Ordnung". Mathematische Annalen. 38 (2): 287–297. doi:10.1007/bf01199255. S2CID 120687043.
- Ernst Kötter (1892). "Ueber diejenigen Polyeder, die bei gegebener Gattung und gegebenem Volumen die kleinste Oberfläche besitzen. Erste Abhandlung". Journal für die reine und angewandte Mathematik. 110: 198–229.
- Ernst Kötter (1900). "Construction der Oberfläche zweiter Ordnung, welche neun gegebene Punkte enthält". Jahresbericht der Deutschen Mathematiker-Vereinigung: 99–102.
