= Kronecker's congruence =

Theorem on a polynomial involving the elliptic modular function

In mathematics, Kronecker's congruence, introduced by Kronecker, states that

$$\Phi_p(x,y)\equiv (x-y^p)(x^p-y)\bmod p,$$

where p is a prime and Φ_{p}(x,y) is the modular polynomial of order p, given by

$$\Phi_n(x,j) = \prod_\tau (x-j(\tau))$$

for j the elliptic modular function and τ running through classes of imaginary quadratic integers of discriminant n.
