= Kronecker symbol =

Symbol in number theory

In number theory, the Kronecker symbol, written as $\left(\frac an\right)$ or $(a|n)$, is a generalization of the Jacobi symbol to all integers $n$. It was introduced by Leopold Kronecker (1885, page 770).

== Definition ==
Let $n$ be a non-zero integer, with prime factorization

$$n=u \cdot p_1^{e_1} \cdots p_k^{e_k},$$

where $u$ is a unit (i.e., $u=\pm1$), and the $p_i$ are primes. Let $a$ be an integer. The Kronecker symbol $\left(\frac{a}{n}\right)$ is defined by

$$\left(\frac{a}{n}\right) := \left(\frac{a}{u}\right) \prod_{i=1}^k \left(\frac{a}{p_i}\right)^{e_i}.$$

For odd $p_i$, the number $\left(\frac{a}{p_i}\right)$ is simply the usual Legendre symbol. This leaves the case when $p_i=2$. We define $\left(\frac{a}{2}\right)$ by

$$\left(\frac{a}{2}\right) :=
\begin{cases}
0 & \mbox{if }a\mbox{ is even,} \\
1 & \mbox{if } a \equiv \pm1 \pmod{8},  \\
-1 & \mbox{if } a \equiv \pm3 \pmod{8}.
\end{cases}$$

Since it extends the Jacobi symbol, the quantity $\left(\frac{a}{u}\right)$ is simply $1$ when $u=1$. When $u=-1$, we define it by

$$\left(\frac{a}{-1}\right) := \begin{cases} -1 & \mbox{if }a < 0, \\ 1 & \mbox{if } a \ge 0. \end{cases}$$

Finally, we put

$$\left(\frac a0\right) := \begin{cases}1&\text{if }a=\pm1,\\0&\text{otherwise.}\end{cases}$$

These extensions suffice to define the Kronecker symbol for all integer values $a,n$.

Some authors only define the Kronecker symbol for more restricted values; for example, $a$ congruent to $0,1\bmod4$ and $n>0$.

== Table of values ==
The following is a table of values of Kronecker symbol $\left(\frac{k}{n}\right)$ with 1 ≤ n, k ≤ 30.

k n	1	2	3	4	5	6	7	8	9	10	11	12	13	14	15	16	17	18	19	20	21	22	23	24	25	26	27	28	29	30
1	1	1	1	1	1	1	1	1	1	1	1	1	1	1	1	1	1	1	1	1	1	1	1	1	1	1	1	1	1	1
2	1	0	−1	0	−1	0	1	0	1	0	−1	0	−1	0	1	0	1	0	−1	0	−1	0	1	0	1	0	−1	0	−1	0
3	1	−1	0	1	−1	0	1	−1	0	1	−1	0	1	−1	0	1	−1	0	1	−1	0	1	−1	0	1	−1	0	1	−1	0
4	1	0	1	0	1	0	1	0	1	0	1	0	1	0	1	0	1	0	1	0	1	0	1	0	1	0	1	0	1	0
5	1	−1	−1	1	0	1	−1	−1	1	0	1	−1	−1	1	0	1	−1	−1	1	0	1	−1	−1	1	0	1	−1	−1	1	0
6	1	0	0	0	1	0	1	0	0	0	1	0	−1	0	0	0	−1	0	−1	0	0	0	−1	0	1	0	0	0	1	0
7	1	1	−1	1	−1	−1	0	1	1	−1	1	−1	−1	0	1	1	−1	1	−1	−1	0	1	1	−1	1	−1	−1	0	1	1
8	1	0	−1	0	−1	0	1	0	1	0	−1	0	−1	0	1	0	1	0	−1	0	−1	0	1	0	1	0	−1	0	−1	0
9	1	1	0	1	1	0	1	1	0	1	1	0	1	1	0	1	1	0	1	1	0	1	1	0	1	1	0	1	1	0
10	1	0	1	0	0	0	−1	0	1	0	−1	0	1	0	0	0	−1	0	−1	0	−1	0	−1	0	0	0	1	0	−1	0
11	1	−1	1	1	1	−1	−1	−1	1	−1	0	1	−1	1	1	1	−1	−1	−1	1	−1	0	1	−1	1	1	1	−1	−1	−1
12	1	0	0	0	−1	0	1	0	0	0	−1	0	1	0	0	0	−1	0	1	0	0	0	−1	0	1	0	0	0	−1	0
13	1	−1	1	1	−1	−1	−1	−1	1	1	−1	1	0	1	−1	1	1	−1	−1	−1	−1	1	1	−1	1	0	1	−1	1	1
14	1	0	1	0	1	0	0	0	1	0	−1	0	1	0	1	0	−1	0	1	0	0	0	1	0	1	0	1	0	−1	0
15	1	1	0	1	0	0	−1	1	0	0	−1	0	−1	−1	0	1	1	0	1	0	0	−1	1	0	0	−1	0	−1	−1	0
16	1	0	1	0	1	0	1	0	1	0	1	0	1	0	1	0	1	0	1	0	1	0	1	0	1	0	1	0	1	0
17	1	1	−1	1	−1	−1	−1	1	1	−1	−1	−1	1	−1	1	1	0	1	1	−1	1	−1	−1	−1	1	1	−1	−1	−1	1
18	1	0	0	0	−1	0	1	0	0	0	−1	0	−1	0	0	0	1	0	−1	0	0	0	1	0	1	0	0	0	−1	0
19	1	−1	−1	1	1	1	1	−1	1	−1	1	−1	−1	−1	−1	1	1	−1	0	1	−1	−1	1	1	1	1	−1	1	−1	1
20	1	0	−1	0	0	0	−1	0	1	0	1	0	−1	0	0	0	−1	0	1	0	1	0	−1	0	0	0	−1	0	1	0
21	1	−1	0	1	1	0	0	−1	0	−1	−1	0	−1	0	0	1	1	0	−1	1	0	1	−1	0	1	1	0	0	−1	0
22	1	0	−1	0	−1	0	−1	0	1	0	0	0	1	0	1	0	−1	0	1	0	1	0	1	0	1	0	−1	0	1	0
23	1	1	1	1	−1	1	−1	1	1	−1	−1	1	1	−1	−1	1	−1	1	−1	−1	−1	−1	0	1	1	1	1	−1	1	−1
24	1	0	0	0	1	0	1	0	0	0	1	0	−1	0	0	0	−1	0	−1	0	0	0	−1	0	1	0	0	0	1	0
25	1	1	1	1	0	1	1	1	1	0	1	1	1	1	0	1	1	1	1	0	1	1	1	1	0	1	1	1	1	0
26	1	0	−1	0	1	0	−1	0	1	0	1	0	0	0	−1	0	1	0	1	0	1	0	1	0	1	0	−1	0	−1	0
27	1	−1	0	1	−1	0	1	−1	0	1	−1	0	1	−1	0	1	−1	0	1	−1	0	1	−1	0	1	−1	0	1	−1	0
28	1	0	−1	0	−1	0	0	0	1	0	1	0	−1	0	1	0	−1	0	−1	0	0	0	1	0	1	0	−1	0	1	0
29	1	−1	−1	1	1	1	1	−1	1	−1	−1	−1	1	−1	−1	1	−1	−1	−1	1	−1	1	1	1	1	−1	−1	1	0	1
30	1	0	0	0	0	0	−1	0	0	0	1	0	1	0	0	0	1	0	−1	0	0	0	1	0	0	0	0	0	1	0

== Properties ==
The Kronecker symbol shares many basic properties of the Jacobi symbol, under certain restrictions:

- $\left(\tfrac an\right)=\pm1$ if $\gcd(a,n)=1$, otherwise $\left(\tfrac an\right)=0$.
- $\left(\tfrac{ab}n\right)=\left(\tfrac an\right)\left(\tfrac bn\right)$ unless $n=-1$, one of $a,b$ is zero and the other one is negative.
- $\left(\tfrac a{mn}\right)=\left(\tfrac am\right)\left(\tfrac an\right)$ unless $a=-1$, one of $m,n$ is zero and the other one has odd part (definition below) congruent to $3\bmod4$.
- For $n>0$, we have $\left(\tfrac an\right)=\left(\tfrac bn\right)$ whenever
  $$a\equiv b\bmod\begin{cases}4n,&n\equiv2\pmod 4,\\n&\text{otherwise.}\end{cases}$$
  If additionally $a,b$ have the same sign, the same also holds for $n<0$.
- For $a\not\equiv3\pmod4$, $a\ne0$, we have $\left(\tfrac am\right)=\left(\tfrac an\right)$ whenever
  $$m\equiv n\bmod\begin{cases}4|a|,&a\equiv2\pmod 4,\\|a|&\text{otherwise.}\end{cases}$$

On the other hand, the Kronecker symbol does not have the same connection to quadratic residues as the Jacobi symbol. In particular, the Kronecker symbol $\left(\tfrac an\right)$ for $n\equiv2\pmod 4$ can take values independently on whether $a$ is a quadratic residue or nonresidue modulo $n$.

=== Quadratic reciprocity ===
The Kronecker symbol also satisfies the following versions of quadratic reciprocity law.

For any nonzero integer $n$, let $n'$ denote its odd part: $n=2^en'$ where $n'$ is odd (for $n=0$, we put $0'=1$). Then the following symmetric version of quadratic reciprocity holds for every pair of integers $m,n$ such that $\gcd(m,n)=1$:

$$\left(\frac mn\right)\left(\frac nm\right)=\pm(-1)^{\frac{m'-1}2\frac{n'-1}2},$$

where the $\pm$ sign is equal to $+$ if $m\ge0$ or $n\ge0$ and is equal to $-$ if $m<0$ and $n<0$.

There is also equivalent non-symmetric version of quadratic reciprocity that holds for every pair of relatively prime integers $m,n$:

$$\left(\frac mn\right)\left(\frac{n}{|m|}\right)=(-1)^{\frac{m'-1}2\frac{n'-1}2}.$$

For any integer $n$ let $n^*=(-1)^{(n'-1)/2}n$. Then we have another equivalent non-symmetric version that states

$$\left(\frac{m^*}{n}\right)=\left(\frac{n}{|m|}\right)$$

for every pair of integers $m,n$ (not necessarily relatively prime).

The supplementary laws generalize to the Kronecker symbol as well. These laws follow easily from each version of quadratic reciprocity law stated above (unlike with Legendre and Jacobi symbol where both the main law and the supplementary laws are needed to fully describe the quadratic reciprocity).

For any integer $n$ we have

$$\left(\frac{-1}{n}\right)=(-1)^{\frac{n'-1}{2}}$$

and for any odd integer $n$ it's

$$\left(\frac{2}{n}\right)=(-1)^{\frac{n^2-1}{8}}.$$

== Connection to Dirichlet characters ==
If $a\not\equiv3\pmod 4$ and $a\ne0$, the map $\chi(n)=\left(\tfrac an\right)$ is a real Dirichlet character of modulus
$$\begin{cases}4|a|,&a\equiv2\pmod 4,\\|a|,&\text{otherwise.}\end{cases}$$
Conversely, every real Dirichlet character can be written in this form with $a\equiv0,1\pmod 4$ (for $a\equiv2\pmod 4$ it's $\left(\tfrac{a}{n}\right)=\left(\tfrac{4a}{n}\right)$).

In particular, primitive real Dirichlet characters $\chi$ are in a 1–1 correspondence with quadratic fields $F=\mathbb Q(\sqrt m)$, where $m$ is a nonzero square-free integer (we can include the case $\mathbb Q(\sqrt1)=\mathbb Q$ to represent the principal character, even though it is not a quadratic field). The character $\chi$ can be recovered from the field as the Artin symbol $\left(\tfrac{F/\mathbb Q}\cdot\right)$: that is, for a positive prime $p$, the value of $\chi(p)$ depends on the behaviour of the ideal $(p)$ in the ring of integers $O_F$:

$$\chi(p)=\begin{cases}0,&(p)\text{ is ramified,}\\1,&(p)\text{ splits,}\\-1,&(p)\text{ is inert.}\end{cases}$$

Then $\chi(n)$ equals the Kronecker symbol $\left(\tfrac Dn\right)$, where

$$D=\begin{cases}m,&m\equiv1\pmod 4,\\4m,&m\equiv2,3\pmod 4\end{cases}$$

is the discriminant of $F$. The conductor of $\chi$ is $|D|$.

Similarly, if $n>0$, the map $\chi(a)=\left(\tfrac an\right)$ is a real Dirichlet character of modulus
$$\begin{cases}4n,&n\equiv2\pmod 4,\\n,&\text{otherwise.}\end{cases}$$
However, not all real characters can be represented in this way, for example the character $\left(\tfrac{-4}\cdot\right)$ cannot be written as $\left(\tfrac\cdot n\right)$ for any $n$. By the law of quadratic reciprocity, we have $\left(\tfrac\cdot n\right)=\left(\tfrac{n^*}\cdot\right)$. A character $\left(\tfrac a\cdot\right)$ can be represented as $\left(\tfrac\cdot n\right)$ if and only if its odd part $a'\equiv1\pmod4$, in which case we can take $n=|a|$.

== See also ==
- Hilbert symbol
