= Kronecker's lemma =

In mathematics, Kronecker's lemma (see, e.g., Shiryaev (1996, Lemma IV.3.2)) is a result about the relationship between convergence of infinite sums and convergence of sequences. The lemma is often used in the proofs of theorems concerning sums of independent random variables such as the strong Law of large numbers. The lemma is named after the German mathematician Leopold Kronecker.

== The lemma ==
If $(x_n)_{n=1}^\infty$ is an infinite sequence of real numbers such that

$$\sum_{m=1}^\infty x_m = s$$

exists and is finite, then we have for all $0<b_1 \leq b_2 \leq b_3 \leq \ldots$ and $b_n \to \infty$ that

$$\lim_{n \to \infty}\frac1{b_n}\sum_{k=1}^n b_kx_k = 0.$$

=== Proof ===
Let $S_k$ denote the partial sums of the x's. Using summation by parts,

$$\frac1{b_n}\sum_{k=1}^n b_k x_k = S_n - \frac1{b_n}\sum_{k=1}^{n-1}(b_{k+1} - b_k)S_k$$

Pick any ε > 0. Now choose N so that $S_k$ is ε-close to s for k > N. This can be done as the sequence $S_k$ converges to s. Then the right hand side is:

$$S_n - \frac1{b_n}\sum_{k=1}^{N-1}(b_{k+1} - b_k)S_k - \frac1{b_n}\sum_{k=N}^{n-1}(b_{k+1} - b_k)S_k$$
$$= S_n - \frac1{b_n}\sum_{k=1}^{N-1}(b_{k+1} - b_k)S_k - \frac1{b_n}\sum_{k=N}^{n-1}(b_{k+1} - b_k)s - \frac1{b_n}\sum_{k=N}^{n-1}(b_{k+1} - b_k)(S_k - s)$$
$$= S_n - \frac1{b_n}\sum_{k=1}^{N-1}(b_{k+1} - b_k)S_k - \frac{b_n-b_N}{b_n}s - \frac1{b_n}\sum_{k=N}^{n-1}(b_{k+1} - b_k)(S_k - s).$$

Now, let n go to infinity. The first term goes to s, which cancels with the third term. The second term goes to zero (as the sum is a fixed value). Since the b sequence is increasing, the last term is bounded by $\epsilon (b_n - b_N)/b_n \leq \epsilon$.
