= Abeltoppen =

Mountain in Svalbard

- Location within Svalbard

Highest point
- Elevation: 1,123 m (3,684 ft)
- Coordinates: 78.850°N 15.885°E

Geography
- Location: Dickson Land, Svalbard, Norway

Abeltoppen is a mountain in Dickson Land at Spitsbergen, Svalbard. It is named after Norwegian mathematician Niels Henrik Abel. The mountain has a height of 1,123 metres (3,684 ft) and is situated between Austfjorden and Dicksonfjorden. The two kilometer long ridge of Abelskuten extends northwards from Abeltoppen.
