= Abel's irreducibility theorem =

Field theory result

In mathematics, Abel's irreducibility theorem, a field theory result described in 1829 by Niels Henrik Abel, asserts that if f(x) is a polynomial over a field F that shares a root with a polynomial g(x) that is irreducible over F, then every root of g(x) is a root of f(x). Equivalently, if f(x) shares at least one root with g(x) then f is divisible evenly by g(x), meaning that f(x) can be factored as g(x)h(x) with h(x) also having coefficients in F.

Corollaries of the theorem include:

- If f(x) is irreducible, there is no lower-degree polynomial (other than the zero polynomial) that shares any root with it. For example, x^{2} − 2 is irreducible over the rational numbers and has $\sqrt{2}$ as a root; hence there is no linear or constant polynomial over the rationals having $\sqrt{2}$ as a root. Furthermore, there is no same-degree polynomial that shares any roots with f(x), other than constant multiples of f(x).
- If f(x) ≠ g(x) are two different irreducible monic polynomials, then they share no roots.
