= Abel's binomial theorem =

Mathematical identity involving sums of binomial coefficients

Abel's binomial theorem, named after Niels Henrik Abel, is a mathematical identity involving sums of binomial coefficients. It states the following:

$$\sum_{k=0}^m \binom{m}{k} (w+m-k)^{m-k-1}(z+k)^k=w^{-1}(z+w+m)^m.$$

== Example ==
=== The case m = 2 ===
$$\begin{align}
& {} \quad \binom{2}{0}(w+2)^1(z+0)^0+\binom{2}{1}(w+1)^0(z+1)^1+\binom{2}{2}(w+0)^{-1}(z+2)^2 \\
& = (w+2)+2(z+1)+\frac{(z+2)^2}{w} \\
& = \frac{(z+w+2)^2}{w}.
\end{align}$$

== See also ==
- Binomial theorem
- Binomial type
