= Abel's identity =

Identity relating to differential equations

In mathematics, Abel's identity (also called Abel's formula or Abel's differential equation identity) is an equation that expresses the Wronskian of two solutions of a homogeneous second-order linear ordinary differential equation in terms of a coefficient of the original differential equation. The relation can be generalised to nth-order linear ordinary differential equations. The identity is named after the Norwegian mathematician Niels Henrik Abel.

Since Abel's identity relates to the different linearly independent solutions of the differential equation, it can be used to find one solution from the other. It provides useful identities relating the solutions, and is also useful as a part of other techniques such as the method of variation of parameters. It is especially useful for equations such as Bessel's equation where the solutions do not have a simple analytical form, because in such cases the Wronskian is difficult to compute directly.

A generalisation of first-order systems of homogeneous linear differential equations is given by Liouville's formula.

== Statement ==
Consider a homogeneous linear second-order ordinary differential equation

$$y'' + p(x)y' + q(x)\,y = 0$$

on an interval I of the real line with real- or complex-valued continuous functions p and q. Abel's identity states that the Wronskian $W=(y_1,y_2)$ of two real- or complex-valued solutions $y_1$ and $y_2$ of this differential equation, that is the function defined by the determinant

$$W(y_1,y_2)(x)
=\begin{vmatrix}y_1(x)&y_2(x)\\y'_1(x)&y'_2(x)\end{vmatrix}
=y_1(x)\,y'_2(x) - y'_1(x)\,y_2(x),\quad x\in I,$$

satisfies the relation

$$W(y_1,y_2)(x)=W(y_1,y_2)(x_0) \cdot \exp\left(-\int_{x_0}^x p(t) \,dt\right),\quad x\in I,$$

for each point $x_0\in I$.

=== Remarks ===
- When the differential equation is real-valued, since $\exp\left(-\int_{x_0}^x p(t) \,dt\right)$ is strictly positive, the Wronskian $W(y_1,y_2)$ is always either identically zero, always positive, or always negative at every point $x$ in $I$.
- If the two solutions $y_1$ and $y_2$ are linearly dependent, then the Wronskian is identically zero. Conversely, if the Wronskian is not zero at any point on the interval, then they are linearly independent.
- It is not necessary to assume that the second derivatives of the solutions $y_1$ and $y_2$ are continuous.
- If $p(x)=0$ then $W$ is constant.

=== Proof ===
Differentiating the Wronskian using the product rule gives (writing $W$ for $W(y_1,y_2)$ and omitting the argument $x$ for brevity)

$$\begin{align}
W' &= y_1' y_2' + y_1 y_2'' - y_1'' y_2 - y_1' y_2' \\
& = y_1 y_2'' - y_1'' y_2.
\end{align}$$

Solving for $y''$ in the original differential equation yields

$$y'' = -(py'+qy).$$

Substituting this result into the derivative of the Wronskian function to replace the second derivatives of $y_1$ and $y_2$ gives

$$\begin{align}
W'&= -y_1(py_2'+qy_2)+(py_1'+qy_1)y_2 \\
&= -p(y_1y_2'-y_1'y_2)\\
&= -pW.
\end{align}$$

Simplifying the equation to

$$W' + pW = 0$$

yields a homogeneous first order linear differential equation that can be solved by using the integrating factor $\exp\left(\int p(x)dx\right)$ and initial condition $W(x_0)$

$$W(x) = W(x_0) \cdot \exp\left(-\int_{x_0}^{x}{p(t)dt}\right)$$

== Generalization ==
The Wronskian $W(y_1,\ldots,y_n)$ of $n$ functions $y_1,\ldots,y_n$ on an interval $I$ is the function defined by the determinant

$$W(y_1,\ldots,y_n)(x)
=\begin{vmatrix}
y_1(x) & y_2(x) & \cdots & y_n(x)\\
y'_1(x) & y'_2(x)& \cdots & y'_n(x)\\
\vdots & \vdots & \ddots & \vdots\\
y_1^{(n-1)}(x) & y_2^{(n-1)}(x) & \cdots & y_n^{(n-1)}(x)
\end{vmatrix},\qquad x\in I,$$

Consider a homogeneous linear ordinary differential equation of order $n \geq 1$:

$$y^{(n)} + p_{n-1}(x)\,y^{(n-1)} + \cdots + p_1(x)\,y' + p_0(x)\,y = 0,$$

on an interval $I$ of the real line with a real- or complex-valued continuous function $p_{n-1}$. Let $y_1,\ldots,y_n$ by solutions of this nth order differential equation. Then the generalisation of Abel's identity states that this Wronskian satisfies the relation:

$$W(y_1,\ldots,y_n)(x)=W(y_1,\ldots,y_n)(x_0) \exp\biggl(-\int_{x_0}^x p_{n-1}(\xi) \,\textrm{d}\xi\biggr),\qquad x\in I,$$

for each point $x_0\in I$.

=== Direct proof ===
For brevity, we write $W$ for $W(y_1,\ldots,y_n)$ and omit the argument $x$. It suffices to show that the Wronskian solves the first-order linear differential equation

$$W'=-p_{n-1}\,W,$$

because the remaining part of the proof then coincides with the one for the case $n=2$.

In the case $n=1$ we have $W=y_1$ and the differential equation for $W$ coincides with the one for $y_1$. Therefore, assume $n \geq 2$ in the following.

The derivative of the Wronskian $W$ is the derivative of the defining determinant. It follows from the Leibniz formula for determinants that this derivative can be calculated by differentiating every row separately, hence

$$\begin{align}W' & =
\begin{vmatrix}
y'_1 & y'_2 & \cdots & y'_n\\
y'_1 & y'_2 & \cdots & y'_n\\
y''_1 & y''_2 & \cdots & y''_n\\
y'''_1 & y'''_2 & \cdots & y'''_n\\
\vdots & \vdots & \ddots & \vdots\\
y_1^{(n-1)} & y_2^{(n-1)} & \cdots & y_n^{(n-1)}
\end{vmatrix}
+
\begin{vmatrix}
y_1 & y_2 & \cdots & y_n\\
y''_1 & y''_2 & \cdots & y''_n\\
y''_1 & y''_2 & \cdots & y''_n\\
y'''_1 & y'''_2 & \cdots & y'''_n\\
\vdots & \vdots & \ddots & \vdots\\
y_1^{(n-1)} & y_2^{(n-1)} & \cdots & y_n^{(n-1)}
\end{vmatrix}\\
&\qquad+\ \cdots\ +
\begin{vmatrix}
y_1 & y_2 & \cdots & y_n\\
y'_1 & y'_2 & \cdots & y'_n\\
\vdots & \vdots & \ddots & \vdots\\
y_1^{(n-3)} & y_2^{(n-3)} & \cdots & y_n^{(n-3)}\\
y_1^{(n-2)} & y_2^{(n-2)} & \cdots & y_n^{(n-2)}\\
y_1^{(n)} & y_2^{(n)} & \cdots & y_n^{(n)}
\end{vmatrix}.\end{align}$$

However, note that every determinant from the expansion contains a pair of identical rows, except the last one. Since determinants with linearly dependent rows are equal to 0, one is only left with the last one:

$$W'=
\begin{vmatrix}
y_1 & y_2 & \cdots & y_n\\
y'_1 & y'_2 & \cdots & y'_n\\
\vdots & \vdots & \ddots & \vdots\\
y_1^{(n-2)} & y_2^{(n-2)} & \cdots & y_n^{(n-2)}\\
y_1^{(n)} & y_2^{(n)} & \cdots & y_n^{(n)}
\end{vmatrix}.$$

Since every $y_i$ solves the ordinary differential equation, we have

$$y_i^{(n)}  + p_{n-2}\,y_i^{(n-2)} + \cdots + p_1\,y'_i + p_0\,y_i = -p_{n-1}\,y_i^{(n-1)}$$

for every $i \in \lbrace 1,\ldots,n \rbrace$. Hence, adding to the last row of the above determinant $p_0$ times its first row, $p_1$ times its second row, and so on until $p_{n-2}$ times its next to last row, the value of the determinant for the derivative of $W$ is unchanged and we get

$$W'=
\begin{vmatrix}
y_1 & y_2 & \cdots & y_n \\
y'_1 & y'_2 & \cdots & y'_n \\
\vdots & \vdots & \ddots & \vdots \\
y_1^{(n-2)} & y_2^{(n-2)} & \cdots & y_n^{(n-2)} \\
-p_{n-1}\,y_1^{(n-1)} & -p_{n-1}\,y_2^{(n-1)} & \cdots & -p_{n-1}\,y_n^{(n-1)}
\end{vmatrix}
=-p_{n-1}W.$$

=== Proof using Liouville's formula ===
The solutions $y_1,\ldots,y_n$ form the square-matrix valued solution

$$\Phi(x)=\begin{pmatrix}
y_1(x) & y_2(x) & \cdots & y_n(x)\\
y'_1(x) & y'_2(x)& \cdots & y'_n(x)\\
\vdots & \vdots & \ddots & \vdots\\
y_1^{(n-2)}(x) & y_2^{(n-2)}(x) & \cdots & y_n^{(n-2)}(x)\\
y_1^{(n-1)}(x) & y_2^{(n-1)}(x) & \cdots & y_n^{(n-1)}(x)
\end{pmatrix},\qquad x\in I,$$

of the $n$-dimensional first-order system of homogeneous linear differential equations

$$\begin{pmatrix}y'\\y''\\\vdots\\y^{(n-1)}\\y^{(n)}\end{pmatrix}
=\begin{pmatrix}0&1&0&\cdots&0\\
0&0&1&\cdots&0\\
\vdots&\vdots&\vdots&\ddots&\vdots\\
0&0&0&\cdots&1\\
-p_0(x)&-p_1(x)&-p_2(x)&\cdots&-p_{n-1}(x)\end{pmatrix}
\begin{pmatrix}y\\y'\\\vdots\\y^{(n-2)}\\y^{(n-1)}\end{pmatrix}.$$

The trace of this matrix is $-p_{n-1}(x)$, hence Abel's identity follows directly from Liouville's formula.
