= Abel's test =

Test for series convergence

In mathematics, Abel's test (also known as Abel's criterion) is a method of testing for the convergence of an infinite series. The test is named after mathematician Niels Henrik Abel, who proved it in 1826. There are two slightly different versions of Abel's test – one is used with series of real numbers, and the other is used with power series in complex analysis. Abel's uniform convergence test is a criterion for the uniform convergence of a series of functions dependent on parameters.

== Abel's test in real analysis ==
Suppose the following statements are true:

1. $\sum a_n$ is a convergent series,
2. $b_n$ is a monotone sequence, and
3. $b_n$ is bounded.

Then $\sum a_nb_n$ is also convergent.

The test is mainly pertinent and useful in the context of non-absolutely convergent series $\sum a_n$. It can be proved directly using summation by parts.

== Abel's test in complex analysis ==
A closely related convergence test, also known as Abel's test, can often be used to establish the convergence of a power series on the boundary of its circle of convergence. Specifically, Abel's test states that if a sequence $(a_n)$ of positive real numbers is decreasing monotonically with
$$\lim_{n\rightarrow\infty} a_n = 0,$$
then the power series
$$f(z) = \sum_{n=0}^\infty a_nz^n$$
converges everywhere on the closed unit circle, except possibly at z = 1. Abel's test cannot be applied when z = 1, so convergence at that single point must be investigated separately.

Abel's test implies in particular that the radius of convergence is at least 1. It can also be applied to a power series with radius of convergence R ≠ 1 by a simple change of variables $\zeta = z/R$. Abel's test is a generalization of the alternating series test, which is the special case z = −1.

Proof of Abel's test: Suppose that z is a point on the unit circle, z ≠ 1. For each $n\geq1$, we define

$$f_n(z):=\sum_{k=0}^n a_k z^k.$$

By multiplying this function by (1 − z), we obtain

$$\begin{align}
(1-z)f_n(z) & = \sum_{k=0}^n a_k (1-z)z^k
= \sum_{k=0}^n a_k z^k - \sum_{k=0}^n a_k z^{k+1}
= a_0 + \sum_{k=1}^n a_k z^k - \sum_{k=1}^{n+1} a_{k-1} z^k  \\
& = a_0 - a_n z^{n+1} + \sum_{k=1}^n (a_k - a_{k-1}) z^k .
\end{align}$$

The first summand is constant, the second converges uniformly to zero (since by assumption the sequence $(a_n)$ converges to zero). It only remains to show that the series converges. We will show this by showing that it even converges absolutely: $\sum_{k=1}^\infty \left|(a_k - a_{k-1}) z^k \right| = \sum_{k=1}^\infty |a_k-a_{k-1}|\cdot |z|^k \leq \sum_{k=1}^\infty (a_{k-1}-a_{k})$ where the last sum is a converging telescoping sum. The absolute value vanished because the sequence $(a_n)$ is decreasing by assumption.

Hence, the sequence $(1-z)f_n(z)$ converges (even uniformly) on the closed unit disc. If $z\not = 1$, we may divide by (1 − z) and obtain the result.

Another way to obtain the result is to apply the Dirichlet's test. Indeed, for $z\ne 1,\ |z|=1$ holds $\left|\sum_{k=0}^n z^k\right|=\left|\frac{z^{n+1}-1}{z-1}\right|\le \frac{2}{|z-1|}$, hence the assumptions of the Dirichlet's test are fulfilled.

The following strengthening of the test is also valid: one may replace the condition that $(a_n)$ is decreasing with the condition that it is decreasing for sufficiently large n, that is, that there is some natural number m for which $a_n \geq a_{n+1}$ whenever n > m.

== Abel's uniform convergence test ==
Abel's uniform convergence test is a criterion for the uniform convergence of a series of functions or an improper integration of functions dependent on parameters. It is related to Abel's test for the convergence of an ordinary series of real numbers, and the proof relies on the same technique of summation by parts.

The test is as follows. Let $\{g_n\}$ be a uniformly bounded sequence of real-valued continuous functions on a set $E$ such that $g_{n+1}(x) \leq g_n(x)$ for all $x \in E$ and positive integers $n$, and let $\{f_n\}$ be a sequence of real-valued functions such that the series $\sum f_n(x)$ converges uniformly on $E$. Then $\sum f_n(x)g_n(x)$ converges uniformly on $E$.
