= Abel's summation formula =

Integration by parts version of Abel's method for summation by parts

In mathematics, Abel's summation formula, introduced by Niels Henrik Abel, is intensively used in analytic number theory and the study of special functions to compute series.

== Formula ==
Let $(a_n)_{n=0}^\infty$ be a sequence of real or complex numbers. Define the partial sum function $A$ by

$$A(t) = \sum_{0 \le n \le t} a_n$$

for any real number $t$. Fix real numbers $x < y$, and let $\phi$ be a continuously differentiable function on $[x, y]$. Then:

$$\sum_{x < n \le y} a_n\phi(n) = A(y)\phi(y) - A(x)\phi(x) - \int_x^y A(u)\phi'(u)\,du.$$

The formula is derived by applying integration by parts for a Riemann–Stieltjes integral to the functions $A$ and $\phi$.

=== Variations ===
Taking the left endpoint to be $-1$ gives the formula

$$\sum_{0 \le n \le x} a_n\phi(n) = A(x)\phi(x) - \int_0^x A(u)\phi'(u)\,du.$$

If the sequence $(a_n)$ is indexed starting at $n = 1$, then we may formally define $a_0 = 0$. The previous formula becomes

$$\sum_{1 \le n \le x} a_n\phi(n) = A(x)\phi(x) - \int_1^x A(u)\phi'(u)\,du.$$

A common way to apply Abel's summation formula is to take the limit of one of these formulas as $x \to \infty$. The resulting formulas are

$$\begin{align}
\sum_{n=0}^\infty a_n\phi(n) &= \lim_{x \to \infty}\bigl(A(x)\phi(x)\bigr) - \int_0^\infty A(u)\phi'(u)\,du, \\
\sum_{n=1}^\infty a_n\phi(n) &= \lim_{x \to \infty}\bigl(A(x)\phi(x)\bigr) - \int_1^\infty A(u)\phi'(u)\,du.
\end{align}$$

These equations hold whenever both limits on the right-hand side exist and are finite.

A particularly useful case is the sequence $a_n = 1$ for all $n \ge 0$. In this case, $A(x) = \lfloor x + 1 \rfloor$. For this sequence, Abel's summation formula simplifies to

$$\sum_{0 \le n \le x} \phi(n) = \lfloor x + 1 \rfloor\phi(x) - \int_0^x \lfloor u + 1\rfloor \phi'(u)\,du.$$

Similarly, for the sequence $a_0 = 0$ and $a_n = 1$ for all $n \ge 1$, the formula becomes

$$\sum_{1 \le n \le x} \phi(n) = \lfloor x \rfloor\phi(x) - \int_1^x \lfloor u \rfloor \phi'(u)\,du.$$

Upon taking the limit as $x \to \infty$, we find

$$\begin{align}
\sum_{n=0}^\infty \phi(n) &= \lim_{x \to \infty}\bigl(\lfloor x + 1 \rfloor\phi(x)\bigr) - \int_0^\infty \lfloor u + 1\rfloor \phi'(u)\,du, \\
\sum_{n=1}^\infty \phi(n) &= \lim_{x \to \infty}\bigl(\lfloor x \rfloor\phi(x)\bigr) - \int_1^\infty \lfloor u\rfloor \phi'(u)\,du,
\end{align}$$

assuming that both terms on the right-hand side exist and are finite.

Abel's summation formula can be generalized to the case where $\phi$ is only assumed to be continuous if the integral is interpreted as a Riemann–Stieltjes integral:

$$\sum_{x < n \le y} a_n\phi(n) = A(y)\phi(y) - A(x)\phi(x) - \int_x^y A(u)\,d\phi(u).$$

By taking $\phi$ to be the partial sum function associated to some sequence, this leads to the summation by parts formula.

== Examples ==
=== Harmonic numbers ===
If $a_n = 1$ for $n \ge 1$ and $\phi(x) = 1/x,$ then $A(x) = \lfloor x \rfloor$ and the formula yields

$$\sum_{n=1}^{\lfloor x \rfloor} \frac{1}{n} = \frac{\lfloor x \rfloor}{x} + \int_1^x \frac{\lfloor u \rfloor}{u^2} \,du.$$

The left-hand side is the harmonic number $H_{\lfloor x \rfloor}$.

=== Representation of Riemann's zeta function ===
Fix a complex number $s$. If $a_n = 1$ for $n \ge 1$ and $\phi(x) = x^{-s},$ then $A(x) = \lfloor x \rfloor$ and the formula becomes

$$\sum_{n=1}^{\lfloor x \rfloor} \frac{1}{n^s} = \frac{\lfloor x \rfloor}{x^s} + s\int_1^x \frac{\lfloor u\rfloor}{u^{1+s}}\,du.$$

If $\Re(s) > 1$, then the limit as $x \to \infty$ exists and yields the formula

$$\zeta(s) = s\int_1^\infty \frac{\lfloor u\rfloor}{u^{1+s}}\,du.$$

where $\zeta(s)$ is the Riemann zeta function. This may be used to derive Dirichlet's theorem that $\zeta(s)$ has a simple pole with residue 1 at s = 1.

=== Reciprocal of Riemann zeta function ===
The technique of the previous example may also be applied to other Dirichlet series. If $a_n = \mu(n)$ is the Möbius function and $\phi(x) = x^{-s}$, then $A(x) = M(x) = \sum_{n \le x} \mu(n)$ is Mertens function and

$$\frac{1}{\zeta(s)} = \sum_{n=1}^\infty \frac{\mu(n)}{n^s} = s\int_1^\infty \frac{M(u)}{u^{1+s}}\,du.$$

This formula holds for $\Re(s) > 1$.

== See also ==
- Summation by parts
- Integration by parts
