= Timiryazev (crater) =

Crater on the Moon

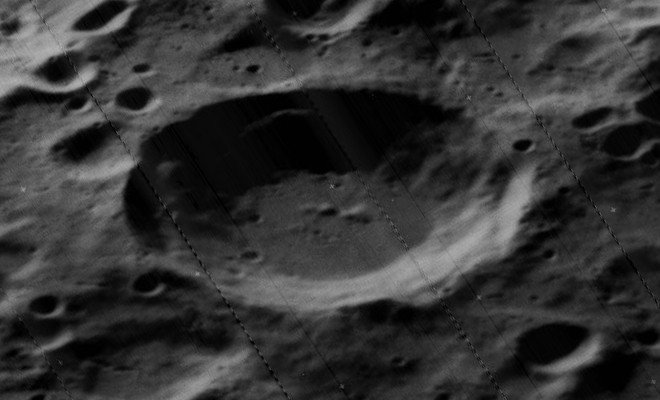
- Oblique Lunar Orbiter 5 image
- Coordinates: 5.5°S 147.0°W
- Diameter: 53 km
- Depth: Unknown
- Colongitude: 147° at sunrise
- Formation: Nectarian
- Eponym: Kliment A. Timiryazev

Timiryazev is a lunar impact crater that is located just to the east of a huge walled plain named Korolev, on the far side of the Moon. It lies to the west-northwest of the crater Sechenov and north-northeast of Mechnikov.

Timiryazev is a crater that dates to the Nectarian age on the lunar geologic timescale. It is a circular crater formation with a slightly eroded outer rim and interior, and an interior floor that is about half the diameter of the crater. No craters of note lie across the crater edges or insides, although the rim is slightly damaged along the southern face. The interior is relatively featureless, with only some slight irregular areas on the floor.

== Satellite craters ==
By convention these features are identified on lunar maps by placing the letter on the side of the crater midpoint that is closest to Timiryazev.

Timiryazev	Latitude	Longitude	Diameter
B	2.3° S	145.7° W	23 km
L	8.2° S	146.4° W	18 km
P	7.9° S	148.0° W	21 km
S	6.0° S	149.4° W	53 km
W	3.0° S	150.0° W	32 km

== See also ==
- 6082 Timiryazev, asteroid
