= Mohorovičić (disambiguation) =

Mohorovičić may refer to:

- Mohorovičić (surname), list of people with the surname
- Mohorovičić discontinuity, the boundary between the Earth's crust and the mantle
- Mohorovičić (crater), a crater on the Moon
