= List of things named after Évariste Galois =

The following is a list of topics named after Évariste Galois (1811–1832), a French mathematician.

== Mathematics ==
- Galois closure
- Galois cohomology
- Galois connection
  - Galois correspondence
- Galois/Counter Mode
- Galois covering
- Galois deformation
- Galois descent
- Galois extension
- Galois field
- Galois geometry
- Galois group
  - Absolute Galois group
- Galois LFSRs
- Galois module
- Galois representation
- Galois ring
- Galois theory
  - Differential Galois theory
  - Topological Galois theory
- Inverse Galois problem

== Other ==
- Galois (crater)
