= Mohorovičić (surname) =

Mohorovičić is a surname. People with the surname include:

- Andrija Mohorovičić, a Croatian seismologist and geophysicist
- Stjepan Mohorovičić, a Croatian physicist, geophysicist and meteorologist

== See also ==
- Mohorović
