= Paschen =

Paschen may refer to:

- Friedrich Paschen (1865–1947), German physicist
  - Paschen (crater), a lunar crater on the far side of the Moon
  - Paschen-Back effect, the splitting of atomic energy levels in the presence of a strong magnetic field
  - Paschen series, a Hydrogen spectral series in the infrared band
  - Paschen's law, an equation that gives the breakdown voltage, that is the voltage necessary to start a discharge or electric arc, between two electrodes in a gas as a function of pressure and gap length
