= Doppler (crater) =

Crater on the Moon

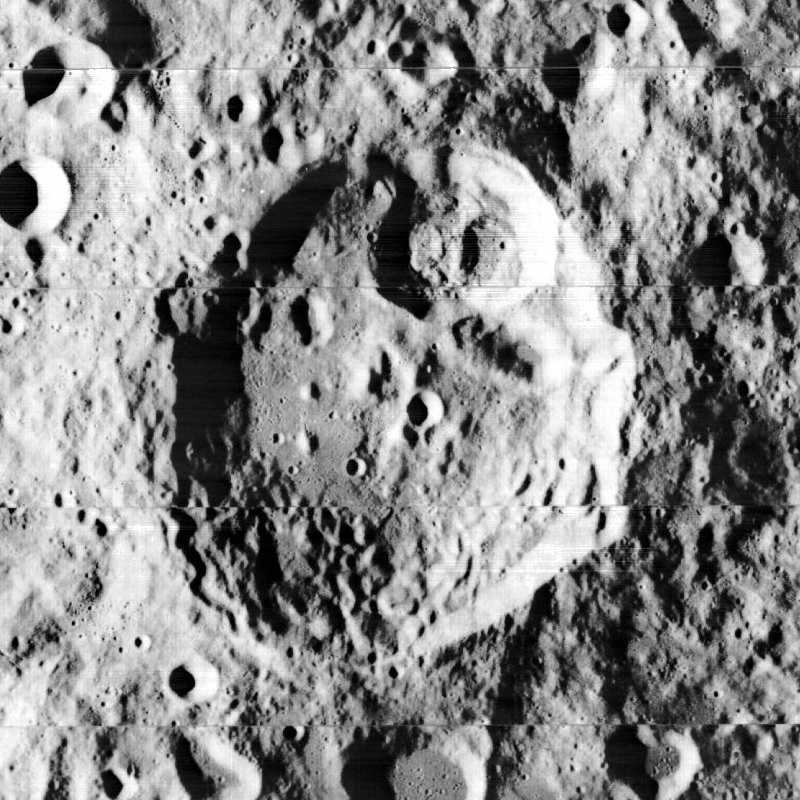
- Lunar Orbiter 1 image
- Coordinates: 12.6°S 159.6°W
- Diameter: 101.79 km (63.25 mi)
- Depth: Unknown
- Colongitude: 161° at sunrise
- Formation: Early Imbrian
- Eponym: Christian Doppler

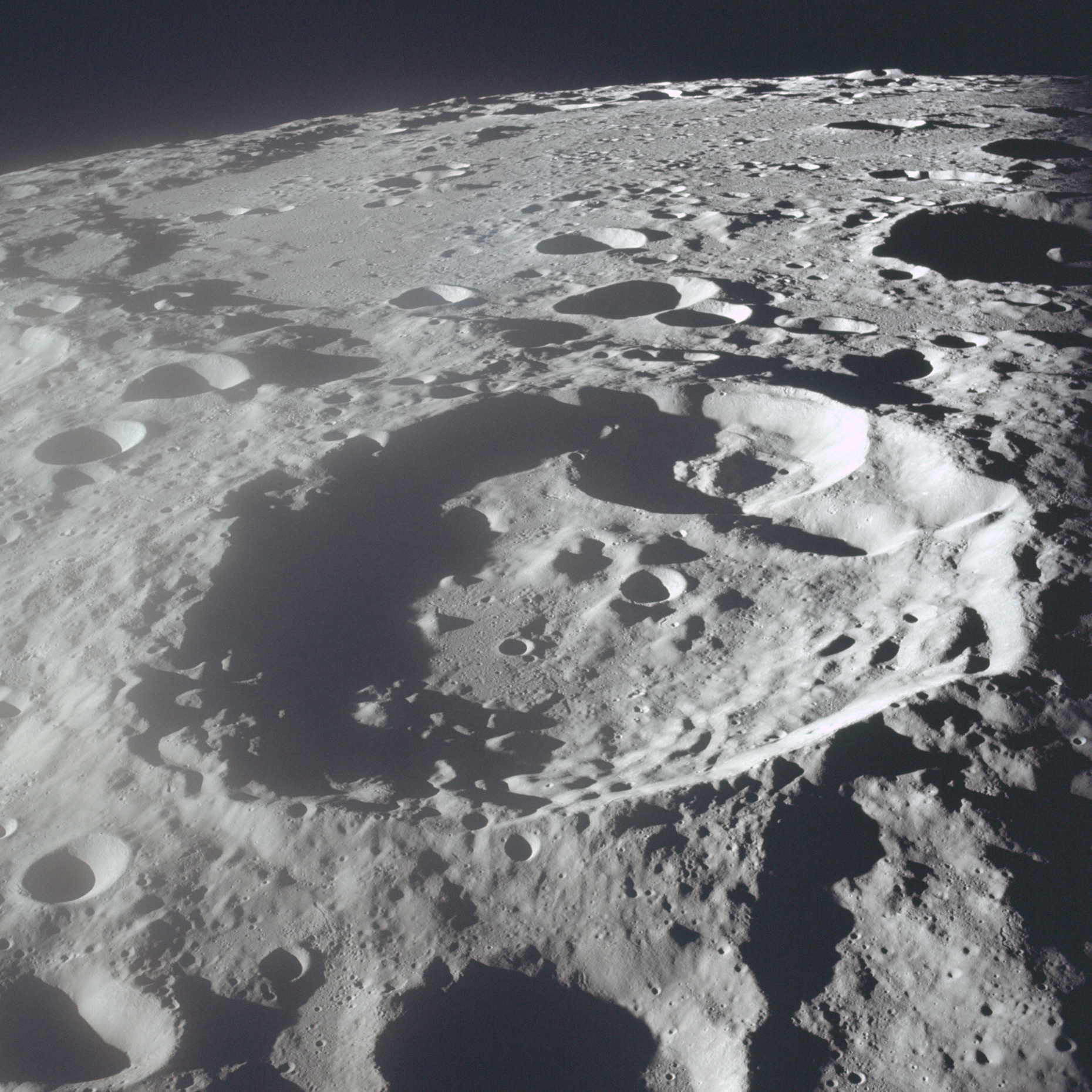
Oblique view of Doppler with Korolev at top, from Apollo 17. NASA photo.

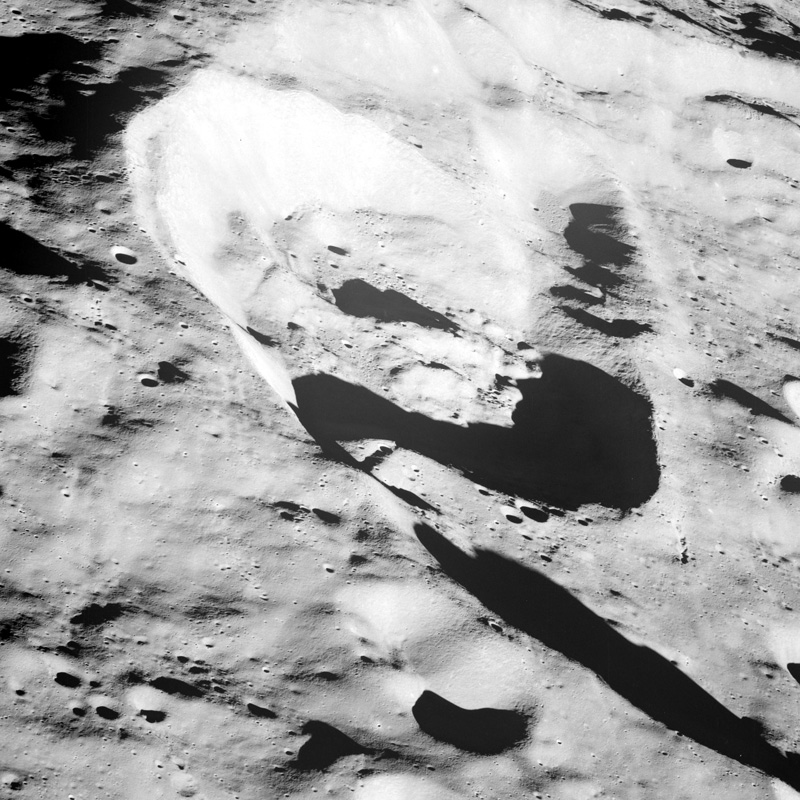
Oblique view of Doppler B, from Apollo 8. NASA photo.

Doppler is a lunar impact crater that is located at the southern edge of the walled plain called Korolev, on the far side of the Moon. It lies just to the north of the South Pole-Aitken basin and has modified the basin rim. To the east is the crater Galois. Farther to the southwest of Doppler is Mohorovičić.

This crater dates to the Early Imbrian period of the lunar geologic timescale. The rim of Doppler has a somewhat polygonal form, and the smaller satellite crater Doppler B is joined with the inner side of the northeast wall. The interior of Doppler is rough and irregular, with some terracing of the worn outer walls, and a complex of central hills to the north of the midpoint. A small, crater-formed valley runs to the southeast across the floor of Doppler from the rim of Doppler B.

This formation is named after Austrian physicist, mathematician, and astronomer Christian Doppler (1803-1853). Its designation was formally adopted by the International Astronomical Union in 1970.

== Satellite craters ==
By convention these features are identified on lunar maps by placing the letter on the side of the crater midpoint that is closest to Doppler.

Doppler	Latitude	Longitude	Diameter
B	11.8° S	159.4° W	37 km
M	15.4° S	160.0° W	25 km
N	16.9° S	160.5° E	17 km
W	11.0° S	161.7° W	15 km
X	10.3° S	161.3° W	18 km
