= Wan-Hoo (crater) =

Crater on the Moon

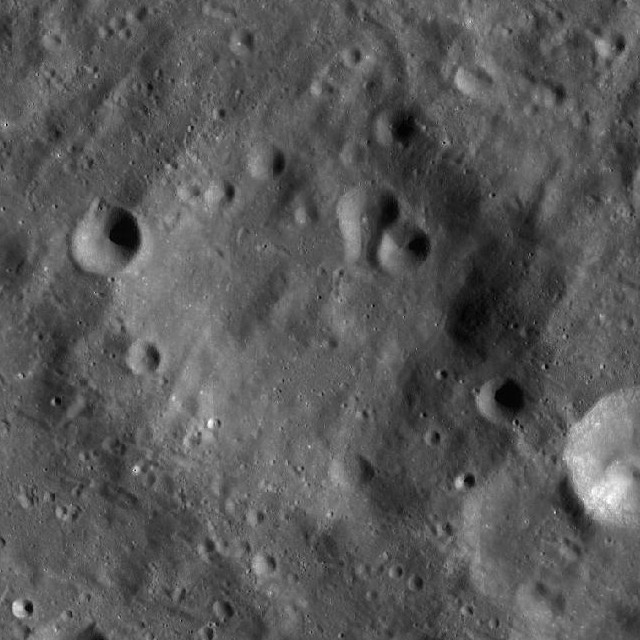
- LRO WAC image
- Coordinates: 9.8°S 138.8°W
- Diameter: 52 km
- Depth: 2375 m
- Colongitude: 139° at sunrise
- Eponym: Wan Hu

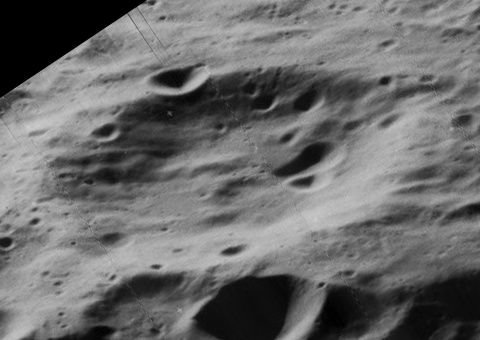
Oblique Lunar Orbiter 5 image

Another view of Wan-Hoo also from Lunar Orbiter 5

Wan-Hoo is a lunar impact crater that is located on the Moon's far side, and it cannot be seen directly from the Earth. It lies to the southwest of a huge walled plain called Hertzsprung, within the outer skirt of ejecta. Just to the south-southwest of Wan-Hoo is the larger crater Paschen, and a little over two crater diameters to the northwest is Sechenov.

Like much of the surrounding terrain, this crater has been modified by the ejecta from Hertzsprung, and material from that impact encroaches along the inner walls and interior of Wan-Hoo. Attached to the east-southeastern outer rim is a large satellite crater, Evans Q, belonging to Evans farther to the east. There is also a small, relatively fresh crater attached to the southeast, and a small, cup-shaped craterlet along the western rim.

This feature was named after Wan Hu, a legendary Chinese figure who is alleged to be the first astronaut.

== Satellite craters ==
By convention these features are identified on lunar maps by placing the letter on the side of the crater midpoint that is closest to Wan-Hoo.

Wan-Hoo	Latitude	Longitude	Radius
T	10.0° S	123.4° W	21 km
