= Louis Richard =

Louis Richard may refer to:

- Louis Claude Richard (1754–1821), French botanist and botanical illustrator
- Louis Richard (footballer)
- Louis Richard (politician) (1817–1876), businessman and politician in Quebec, Canada
- Louis Paul Émile Richard (1795–1849), French mathematician
- Louis Richard (racing driver), winner of the 1953 Boucles de Spa
