= Andrija Mohorovičić Gymnasium =

Public high school in Rijeka, Croatia

- Gimnazija Andrije Mohorovičića

Location
- Ulica Frana Kurelca 1 HR-51000 Rijeka; Croatia
- 45.3282°N 14.4416°E

Information
- Former names: Rijeka Gymnasium (1627); Croatian Real Gymnasium (1945); Real Gymnasium Rijeka (1946); First Gymnasium Rijeka (1949); Center for Specialized Education of Economic, Administrative, Mathematical and Informatics Personnel (1978); Andrija Mohorovičić Gymnasium (1992)
- School type: Public, Gymnasium
- Established: 1992; 34 years ago
- Secondary years taught: 9–12
  - Grade 9: 130 (2024–25)
- Language: Croatian
- Website: Official website (in Croatian)
- Last updated: June 17, 2025

Andrija Mohorovičić Gymnasium (Croatian: Gimnazija Andrije Mohorovičića) is a high school in Rijeka, Croatia.

It was named after Andrija Mohorovičić in 1992, when a second organization with a science curriculum was added to the Rijeka Gymnasium at Kurelčeva St. (the original tradition of which was otherwise inherited by the First Rijeka Croatian Gymnasium).

After the school year 2023/24, 100 graduates of this gymnasium enrolled at an institution of higher learning in Croatia, or 87.72% of students who took up the nationwide Matura exams. The most common destinations for these students were the University of Rijeka faculties of maritime studies, law, economics, humanities and social sciences, as well as the University of Zagreb faculty of electrical engineering and computing.
