= Oblivionis =

Oblivionis may refer to:

- Lacus Oblivionis, a lunar mare
- Oblivionis Flumen, the Latin name of the Lethe
- Oblivionis, the stage name of Sakiko Togawa, a fictional character from BanG Dream!
