= 1262 Sniadeckia =

Large main-belt asteroid

Discovery
- Discovered by: S. Arend
- Discovery site: Uccle Obs.
- Discovery date: 23 March 1933

Designations
- Named after: Jan Śniadecki (Polish astronomer)
- Alternative designations: 1933 FE · 1949 JJ; 2016 FS_{5} · A907 GU
- Minor planet category: main-belt · (outer) background

Orbital characteristics
- Epoch 4 September 2017 (JD 2458000.5)
- Uncertainty parameter 0
- Observation arc: 110.47 yr (40,350 days)
- Aphelion: 3.0167 AU
- Perihelion: 2.9870 AU
- Semi-major axis: 3.0019 AU
- Eccentricity: 0.0049
- Orbital period (sidereal): 5.20 yr (1,900 days)
- Mean anomaly: 346.50°
- Mean motion: 0° 11^{m} 22.2^{s} / day
- Inclination: 13.131°
- Longitude of ascending node: 124.29°
- Argument of perihelion: 146.87°

Physical characteristics
- Dimensions: 51.34±15.63 km 51.49±6.2 km 51.55 km (derived); 53.54±11.23 km 58.196±1.233 km 59.092±19.02 km 59.49±0.82 km 71.011±0.457 km
- Synodic rotation period: 17.57 h 21.2±0.1 h
- Geometric albedo: 0.028±0.004; 0.03±0.01; 0.0323±0.0251; 0.040±0.001; 0.04±0.03; 0.0442±0.0046; 0.0529±0.016; 0.0563 (derived)
- Spectral type: SMASS = C B–V = 0.740; U–B = 0.380
- Absolute magnitude (H): 10.18 · 10.25 · 10.30±0.30

1262 Sniadeckia, provisional designation 1933 FE, is a carbonaceous background asteroid from the asteroid belt's outer regions, approximately 54 kilometers in diameter. It was discovered on 23 March 1933, by Belgian astronomer Sylvain Arend at the Royal Observatory of Belgium in Uccle. The asteroid was named for Polish astronomer Jan Śniadecki. It has a notably low eccentricity of only 0.005.

== Orbit and classification ==
Sniadeckia is a non-family asteroid from the main belt's background population. It orbits the Sun in the outer asteroid belt at a distance of 2.99–3.00 AU once every 5 years and 2 months (1,900 days; semi-major axis of 3.00 AU). Its orbit has an eccentricity of only 0.005 and an inclination of 13° with respect to the ecliptic.

The asteroid was first identified as A907 GU at Heidelberg Observatory in April 1907. The body's observation arc begins with its official discovery observation at Uccle in 1933.

== Physical characteristics ==
In the SMASS classification, Sniadeckia is a carbonaceous C-type asteroid.

=== Rotation period ===
In January 1984, the first and best-rated rotational lightcurve of Sniadeckia was obtained from photometric observations by astronomer Richard Binzel. Lightcurve analysis gave a rotation period of 17.57 hours with a brightness variation of 0.16 magnitude (U=3). French amateur astronomer Laurent Bernasconi measured an alternative period of 21.2 with an amplitude of 0.10 magnitude in April 2006 (U=2).

=== Diameter and albedo ===
According to the surveys carried out by the Infrared Astronomical Satellite IRAS, the Japanese Akari satellite and the NEOWISE mission of NASA's Wide-field Infrared Survey Explorer, Sniadeckia measures between 51.34 and 71.011 kilometers in diameter and its surface has an albedo between 0.028 and 0.0529.

The Collaborative Asteroid Lightcurve Link derives an albedo of 0.0563 and a diameter of 51.55 kilometers based on an absolute magnitude of 10.18.

== Naming ==
This minor planet was named by Tadeusz Banachiewicz after Jan Śniadecki (1756–1830), a Polish professor of mathematics and astronomy, who founded the Kraków Observatory (055). The lunar crater Sniadecki is also named in his honor. The official naming citation was mentioned in The Names of the Minor Planets by Paul Herget in 1955 (H 116).
