= Mohorovičić (crater) =

Crater on the Moon

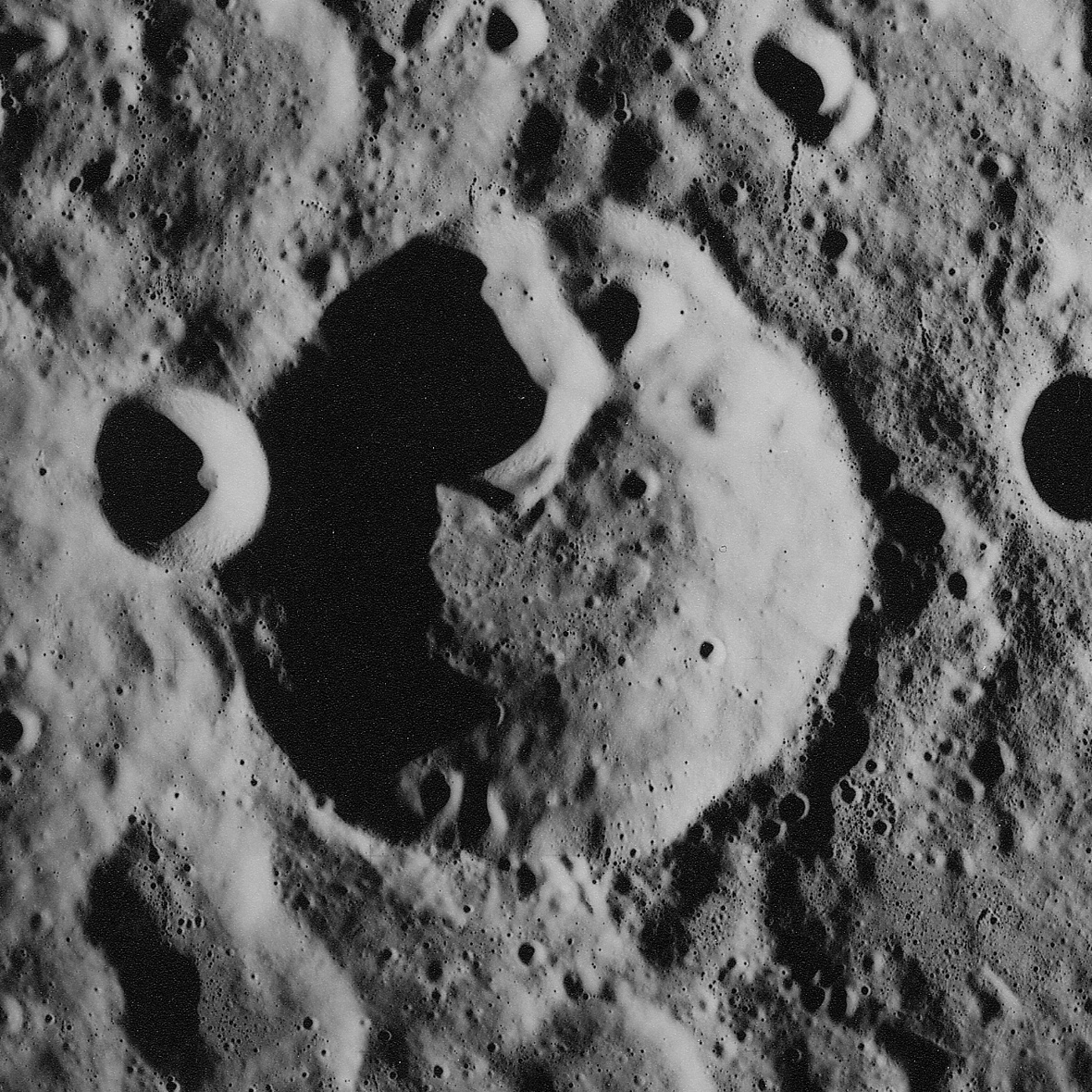
- Apollo 17 image
- Coordinates: 19.0°S 146.0°E
- Diameter: 51 km
- Depth: Unknown
- Colongitude: 165° at sunrise
- Eponym: Andrija Mohorovičić (1970)

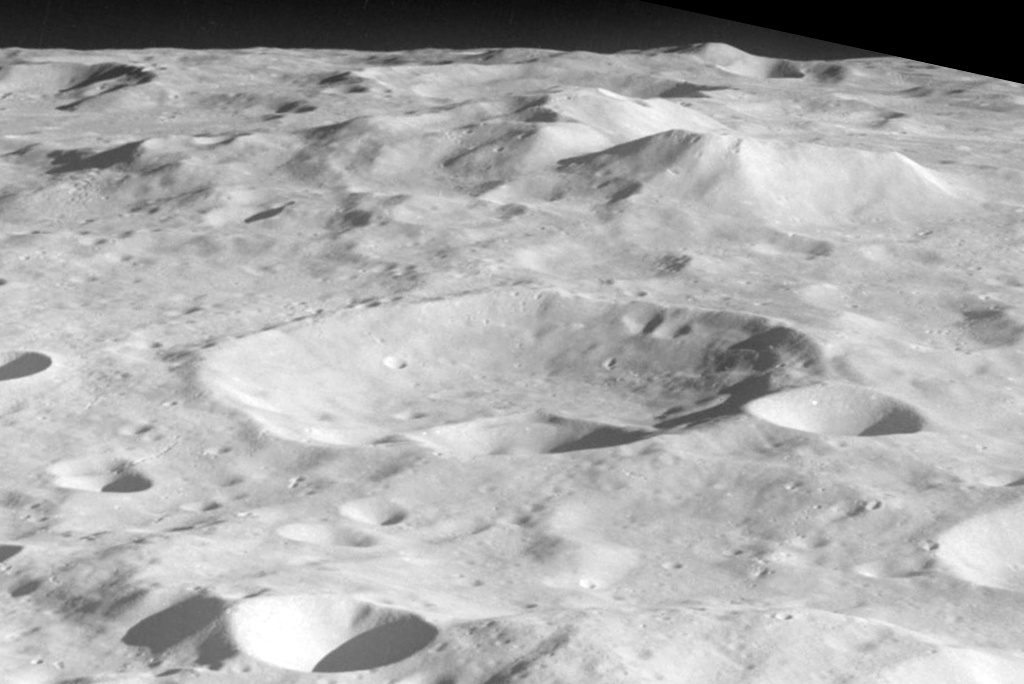
Oblique view facing south from Apollo 8

Mohorovičić is a lunar impact crater that is located on the far side of the Moon. It lies to the southwest of the larger crater Doppler and Korolev, a huge walled plain. To the southwest of Mohorovičić is a small lunar mare that has been named Lacus Oblivionis. Due south of it is an unnamed mountain that formed during the impact that created the South Pole-Aitken Basin.

This is a circular crater that has undergone some wear from subsequent impacts. The satellite crater Mohorovičić Z lies on the northern interior floor, adjacent to the northern inner wall and rim. A small, cup-shaped crater is intruding into the western rim.

== Satellite craters ==
By convention these features are identified on lunar maps by placing the letter on the side of the crater midpoint that is closest to Mohorovičić.

| Mohorovičić | Latitude | Longitude | Diameter |
|---|---|---|---|
| A | 16.0° S | 163.1° W | 20 km |
| D | 17.8° S | 162.1° W | 18 km |
| F | 18.9° S | 163.6° W | 23 km |
| R | 19.9° S | 167.7° W | 42 km |
| W | 17.7° S | 166.5° W | 21 km |
| Z | 18.6° S | 165.1° W | 14 km |

== Sources ==
- Andersson, L. E.; Whitaker, E. A. (1982). NASA Catalogue of Lunar Nomenclature. NASA RP-1097.
- Blue, Jennifer (July 25, 2007). "Gazetteer of Planetary Nomenclature". USGS.
- Bussey, B.; Spudis, P. (2004). The Clementine Atlas of the Moon. New York: Cambridge University Press. ISBN 978-0-521-81528-4.
- Cocks, Elijah E.; Cocks, Josiah C. (1995). Who's Who on the Moon: A Biographical Dictionary of Lunar Nomenclature. Tudor Publishers. ISBN 978-0-936389-27-1.
- McDowell, Jonathan (July 15, 2007). "Lunar Nomenclature". Jonathan's Space Report. Archived from the original on 2012-02-08.
- Menzel, D. H.; Minnaert, M.; Levin, B.; Dollfus, A.; Bell, B. (1971). "Report on Lunar Nomenclature by the Working Group of Commission 17 of the IAU". Space Science Reviews. 12 (2): 136–186. Bibcode:1971SSRv...12..136M. doi:10.1007/BF00171763. S2CID 122125855.
- Moore, Patrick (2001). On the Moon. Sterling Publishing Co. ISBN 978-0-304-35469-6.
- Price, Fred W. (1988). The Moon Observer's Handbook. Cambridge University Press. ISBN 978-0-521-33500-3.
- Rükl, Antonín (1990). Atlas of the Moon. Kalmbach Books. ISBN 978-0-913135-17-4.
- Webb, Rev. T. W. (1962). Celestial Objects for Common Telescopes (6th revised ed.). Dover. ISBN 978-0-486-20917-3.
- Whitaker, Ewen A. (1999). Mapping and Naming the Moon. Cambridge University Press. ISBN 978-0-521-62248-6.
- Wlasuk, Peter T. (2000). Observing the Moon. Springer. ISBN 978-1-85233-193-1.
