= Sniadecki (crater) =

Crater on the Moon

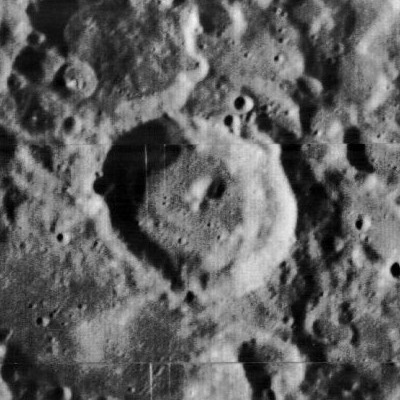
- Lunar Orbiter 1 image
- Coordinates: 22.5°S 168.9°W
- Diameter: 43 km
- Depth: Unknown
- Colongitude: 169° at sunrise
- Formation: Nectarian
- Eponym: Jan Śniadecki

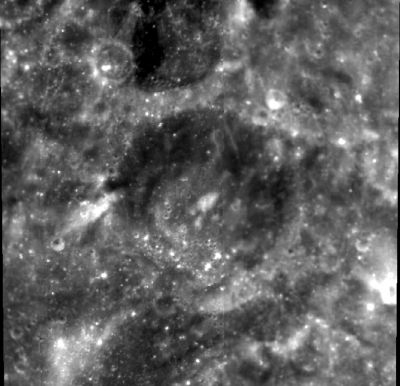
Clementine mosaic

Sniadecki is a lunar impact crater on the far side of the Moon.

On the lunar geologic timescale, Sniadecki dates to the Nectarian period. This is a circular, bowl-shaped feature that is not overlain by any significant impacts. However the larger satellite crater Sniadecki Q is attached to the southwestern outer rim and has disrupted the rim edge somewhat. There is also a small crater attached to the western outer rim.

To the northeast of Sniadecki is a small lunar mare feature that has been designated Lacus Oblivionis. To the northwest of Sniadecki is the crater Bok.

== Satellite craters ==
By convention these features are identified on lunar maps by placing the letter on the side of the crater midpoint that is closest to Sniadecki.

Sniadecki	Latitude	Longitude	Diameter
F	22.4° S	166.9° W	12 km
J	24.7° S	166.9° W	27 km
Q	23.0° S	170.1° W	77 km
Y	21.1° S	169.3° W	35 km

== See also ==
- 1262 Sniadeckia, asteroid
