= Mohorović =

Mohorović is a surname. The Croatian census of 2011 listed it as one of the most common surnames in Sveta Nedelja, Istria.

Notable people with the surname include:

- Orlando Mohorović, a Croatian artist
- Josip Mohorović, a Croatian footballer and manager

== See also ==
- Joseph Mohorovic
- Mohorovičić
