= 1855 Korolev =

Stony main-belt asteroid

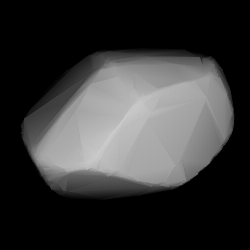
- Shape model of Korolev from its lightcurve

Discovery
- Discovered by: L. Chernykh
- Discovery site: Crimean Astrophysical Obs.
- Discovery date: 8 October 1969

Designations
- Named after: Sergey Korolyov (Soviet rocket engineer)
- Alternative designations: 1969 TU_{1} · 1961 JD; 1964 DD
- Minor planet category: main-belt · Flora

Orbital characteristics
- Epoch 4 September 2017 (JD 2458000.5)
- Uncertainty parameter 0
- Observation arc: 55.74 yr (20,358 days)
- Aphelion: 2.4363 AU
- Perihelion: 2.0583 AU
- Semi-major axis: 2.2473 AU
- Eccentricity: 0.0841
- Orbital period (sidereal): 3.37 yr (1,231 days)
- Mean anomaly: 286.81°
- Mean motion: 0° 17^{m} 33.36^{s} / day
- Inclination: 3.0793°
- Longitude of ascending node: 191.03°
- Argument of perihelion: 349.40°

Physical characteristics
- Dimensions: 6.789±0.253 km 7.47 km (calculated)
- Synodic rotation period: 4.65±0.01 h 4.656199±0.000001 h 4.6568±0.0001 h (Note: Lightcurve plot by Pravec (2008) with rotation period 4.6568±0.0001 hours with a brightness amplitude of 0.75 mag and a quality code of 3. Summary figures at Collaborative Asteroid Lightcurve Link (CALL) for (1855) Korolev. Unpublished Ondrejov data obtained by the NEO Photometric Program and collaborating projects); 4.66±0.01 h
- Geometric albedo: 0.24 (assumed); 0.319±0.032
- Spectral type: S
- Absolute magnitude (H): 12.70 · 12.8

1855 Korolev (prov. designation: 1969 TU_{1}) is a stony Flora asteroid from the inner regions of the asteroid belt, approximately 7 kilometers in diameter. Discovered in 1969, it was later named after Soviet rocket engineer Sergei Korolev.

== Discovery ==
Korolev was discovered by Russian astronomer Lyudmila Chernykh at the Crimean Astrophysical Observatory in Nauchnyj on 8 October 1969. On the same night, she also discovered 1856 Růžena.

It was first identified as 1961 JD at Goethe Link Observatory in 1961, extending the body's observation arc by 8 years prior to its official discovery observation.

== Orbit and classification ==
The asteroid orbits the Sun in the inner main-belt at a distance of 2.1–2.4 AU once every 3 years and 4 months (1,231 days). Its orbit has an eccentricity of 0.08 and an inclination of 3° with respect to the ecliptic.

== Naming ==
This minor planet was named in honor of Sergei Korolev (1907–1966), a designer, integrator, organizer and strategic planner. He was the lead Soviet rocket engineer and spacecraft designer in the Space Race between the United States and the Soviet Union during the 1950s and 1960s until his early death. The lunar and Martian craters Korolev are also named in his honour. The official naming citation was published by the Minor Planet Center on 1 June 1975 (M.P.C. 3825).

== Physical characteristics ==
Korolev is characterized as a common stony S-type asteroid.

=== Diameter and albedo ===
According to the surveys carried out by NASA's space-based Wide-field Infrared Survey Explorer with its subsequent NEOWISE mission, Korolev measures 6.79 kilometers in diameter, and its surface has a high albedo of 0.319, while the Collaborative Asteroid Lightcurve Link assumes an albedo of 0.24 – derived from 8 Flora, the largest member and namesake of its orbital family – and calculates a diameter of 7.47 kilometers with an absolute magnitude of 12.8.

=== Rotation period ===
In March 2008, three rotational lightcurves of Korolev were obtained from photometric observation made by astronomers James W. Brinsfield, Petr Pravec and René Roy, giving a well-defined rotation period of 4.65–4.66 hours with a brightness variation 0.75 and 0.76 magnitude, respectively (U=3/2/3). Another concurring lightcurve was published in March 2016, using sparse-in-time photometry data from the Lowell Photometric Database (U=n.a.).
