= Wan Hu =

Legendary Chinese character

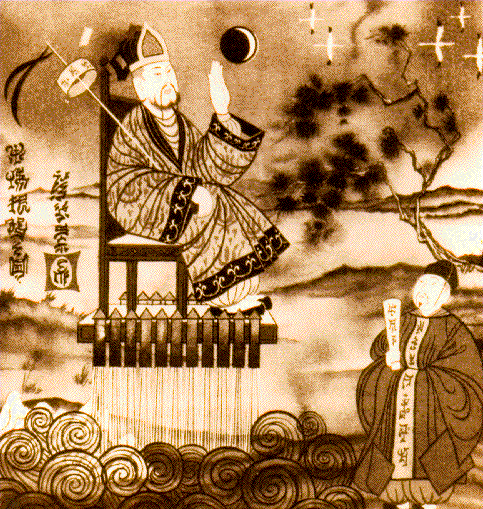
- Illustration of Wan Hu (courtesy of United States Civil Air Patrol)
- Chinese: 萬戶 or 萬虎
Transcriptions
Standard Mandarin
- Hanyu Pinyin: Wàn Hù or Wàn Hŭ
- Bopomofo: ㄨㄢˋ ㄏㄨˋ
- Wade–Giles: Wan^{4} Hu^{4}
Yue: Cantonese
- Yale Romanization: maan^{6} wu^{6}
Middle Chinese
- Middle Chinese: mjonH huX
Old Chinese
- Baxter–Sagart (2014): *Cma[n]-s m-qʕaʔ

Alternative Chinese name
- Chinese: 陶成道
Transcriptions
Standard Mandarin
- Hanyu Pinyin: Táo Chéngdào
- Bopomofo: ㄊㄠˊ ㄔㄥˊ ㄉㄠˋ
- Wade–Giles: t'ao^{2} ch'eng^{2} tao^{4}
Yue: Cantonese
- Yale Romanization: tou^{4} sing^{4} dou^{6}
Middle Chinese
- Middle Chinese: daw dzyeng dawX
Old Chinese
- Zhengzhang: /*bl'uː djeŋ l'uːʔ/

Wan Hu is an alleged Chinese official said to be the first man to attempt to use a rocket to launch into outer space, first described in the early 20th century in American publications, with no known prior Chinese accounts. Credited as possibly the "world's first astronaut" and "the first martyr in man's struggle to achieve space flight", the International Astronomical Union named the crater Wan-Hoo on the far side of the Moon after him in 1970.

According to some Chinese sources, "Wan Hu" was a title granted to him by the imperial court during the early Ming dynasty, and his real name was Tao Chengdao. As a Ming official, he was interested in technological innovation, particularly concerning rockets. He is said to have died in 1390.

While the legend is well-known, there is no direct evidence surviving to substantiate it. According to Joseph Needham, the story is dubious and may have been invented during or after the Chinoiserie period, considering the lack of firm historical reference. However, Li Chengzhi has argued for the story's plausibility, saying that it may have come from oral transmission by European missionaries who came to China during the late Ming and Qing dynasties, or based on records in an ancient Chinese document that has been subsequently lost.

== Legend ==
=== Basic story ===
The story concerns an imperial Chinese official, referred to as Wan Hu. In order to realize his dream of reaching the heavens, he sat on a chair with 47 rockets tied to it, holding a kite in each of his hands, and flying into the sky after his servants were ordered to light the fuses to the rockets. But the rockets then exploded. When the air cleared, Wan Hu was gone. There are also variations of this story.

=== "Wang Tu" ===
A precursor of the story of Wan Hu appeared in an article by the son of John Elfreth Watkins, published in the 2 October 1909 issue of Scientific American, which used the name Wang Tu instead of Wan Hu:

Tradition asserts that the first to sacrifice himself to the problem of flying was Wang Tu, a Chinese mandarin of about 2,000 years B.C. who, having had constructed a pair of large, parallel and horizontal kites, seated himself in a chair fixed between them while forty-seven attendants each with a candle ignited forty-seven rockets placed beneath the apparatus. But the rocket under the chair exploded, burnt the mandarin and so angered the Emperor that he ordered a severe paddling for Wang.

The possibly farcical text proceeds to describe several other fictional stories of ancient aviators. A date of 2000 BCE pre-dates the emergence of writing in China by three or four centuries and pre-dates the invention of gunpowder-based rockets in China by about 3,000 years.

=== "Wan Hu" ===
The legend of "Wan Hu" was widely disseminated by an unreferenced account in Rockets and Jets by American author Herbert S. Zim in 1945.

Before leaving this period entirely, the story of Wan-Hoo must be included. This Chinese gentleman and scholar, who lived at the turn of the fifteenth century, if records are correct, was an official who experimented with rockets. Let's give Wan-Hoo credit for being the first to try to use rockets as a means of transportation. Wan-Hoo first secured two large kites, arranged them side by side and fixed a chair to a framework between them. On the frame he attached 47 of the largest rockets he could buy. When all was arranged Wan-Hoo sat down on the chair and commanded his coolies to stand by with torches. At a signal these assistants ran up and applied their torches to all 47 rockets. There was a roar and blast of flame. Wan-Hoo, the experimenter, disappeared in a burst of flame and smoke. The first attempt at rocket flight was not a success.

Another book from the same year, The Coming Age of Rocket Power by George Edward Pendray, sets the story in "About the year 1500" and describes it as an "often repeated tale of those early days" of rocket propulsion.

According to Walter Sierra, "Though doomed to fail, the Chinese scholar Wan Hu has been universally acknowledged as the first man to try flying to space with the help of rockets. In memory, NASA named the Wan-Hoo crater on the back of the Moon after him", although according to Mark Williamson most authorities consider the story apocryphal. Meanwhile, some Chinese scholars believe that foreigners from several different countries in the West were unlikely to fabricate a story about an ancient Chinese official flying into the sky out of thin air. The tale may be based on the stories told by European missionaries who arrived in China since the late Ming dynasty, and then passed on by word of mouth. Alternatively, these European and American scholars may have indirectly relied on records in an ancient Chinese document that has been subsequently lost. According to William E. Burrows, "If it really happened, Wan Hu had the triple distinction of being the first person to ride a rocket, the first to fly on a self-propelled, heavier-than-air device, and the first rocket pilot to get killed during a test flight.".

== Popular culture ==
- In a 2004 episode of the television series MythBusters, an attempt was made to recreate Wan Hu's flight using materials that would have been available to him. The chair exploded on the launch pad, with the crash test dummy showing what would be severe burns. An attempt was also made using a chair with modern rockets attached; however, the uncontrollable craft proved that there were far too many complications for such a thing to have succeeded. It was determined that small rockets that can be strapped to a chair cannot provide sufficient thrust to effectively lift it, giving the legend the label of myth "busted". The view the crew members had of the first test's performance matched what the legend said; after the smoke from the explosion had cleared, both the dummy and the chair had disappeared, though the dummy and the remains of the chair were found next to the "launch-pad".
- In the Tokyo DisneySea attraction Soaring: Fantastic Flight a painting of the story of Wan Hu can be seen in the rotunda of the Museum of Fantastic Flight queue area alongside other paintings of legendary attempts at human flight.
- In Kung Fu Panda, the main character Po straps himself to a chair with fireworks attached and launches himself into the sky in order to attend the Dragon Warrior reveal ceremony. According to the film's director's commentary the idea was based on "a myth of a low level Chinese official from the Ming Dynasty who tried to go to the moon by strapping rockets to a chair."

== See also ==
- Lagâri Hasan Çelebi
- Space exploration
- Larry Walters
- List of inventors killed by their own invention
- Berthold Schwarz - a semi-legendary inventor of gunpowder, executed for his invention.
