= Jan Śniadecki =

Polish mathematician and philosopher (1756–1830)

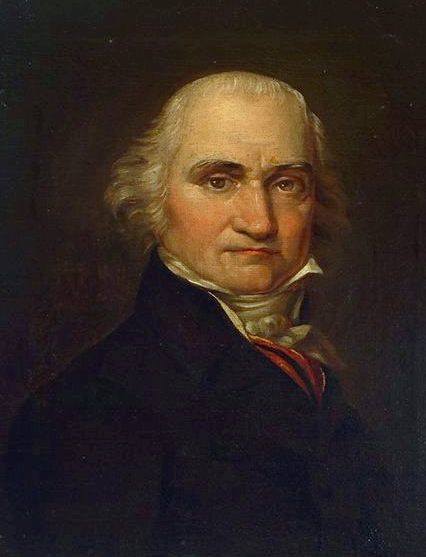
- Jan Śniadecki (1823 painting by Jan Rustem)
- Born: 29 August 1756; Żnin, Polish–Lithuanian Commonwealth
- Died: 9 November 1830 (aged 74); Jašiūnai Manor, Partitioned Poland
- Relatives: Jędrzej Śniadecki (brother)

Philosophical work
- Main interests: Mathematics, philosophy, astronomy

Signature
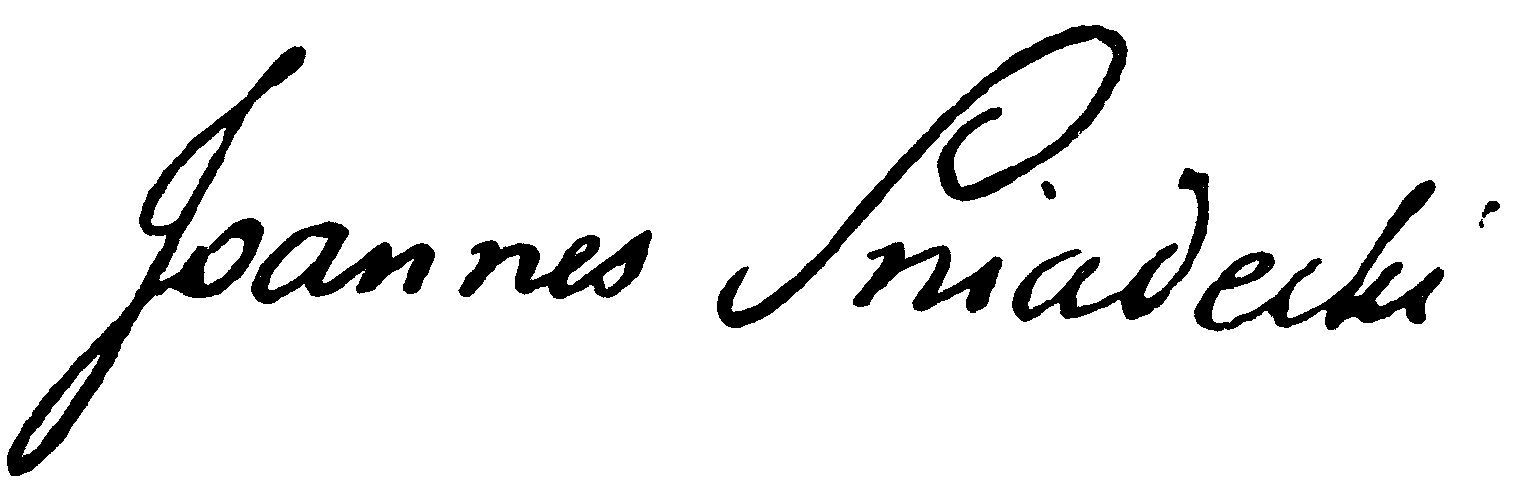

Jan Śniadecki (29 August 1756 – 9 November 1830) was a Polish mathematician, philosopher, and astronomer at the turn of the 18th and 19th centuries.

== Life ==
Born in Żnin, Śniadecki studied at Kraków Jagellonian University and in Paris. He was rector of the Imperial University of Vilnius, a member of the Commission of National Education, and director of astronomical observatories at Kraków (055) and Vilnius. He died at Jašiūnai Manor near Vilnius.

Śniadecki published many works, including his observations on recently discovered planetoids. His O rachunku losów (On the Calculation of Chance, 1817) was a work in probability.

He was brother to Jędrzej Śniadecki.

== Honours ==
The lunar crater Sniadecki and the main-belt asteroid 1262 Sniadeckia were named in his honour.

== Works ==
- "Rachunku algebraicznego teoria" (1783)
- "Geografia, czyli opisanie matematyczne i fizyczne ziemi" (1804)
- "Rozprawa o Koperniku" (Discourse on Nicolaus Copernicus, biography, 1802)
- "O rachunku losów" (1817)
- "Trygonometria kulista analitycznie wyłożona" (1817)
- "O pismach klasycznych i romantycznych", Dziennik Wileński (1819)
- "Filozofia umysłu ludzkiego" (1821)

== See also ==
- History of philosophy in Poland
- List of Poles
