= Paschen (crater) =

Crater on the Moon

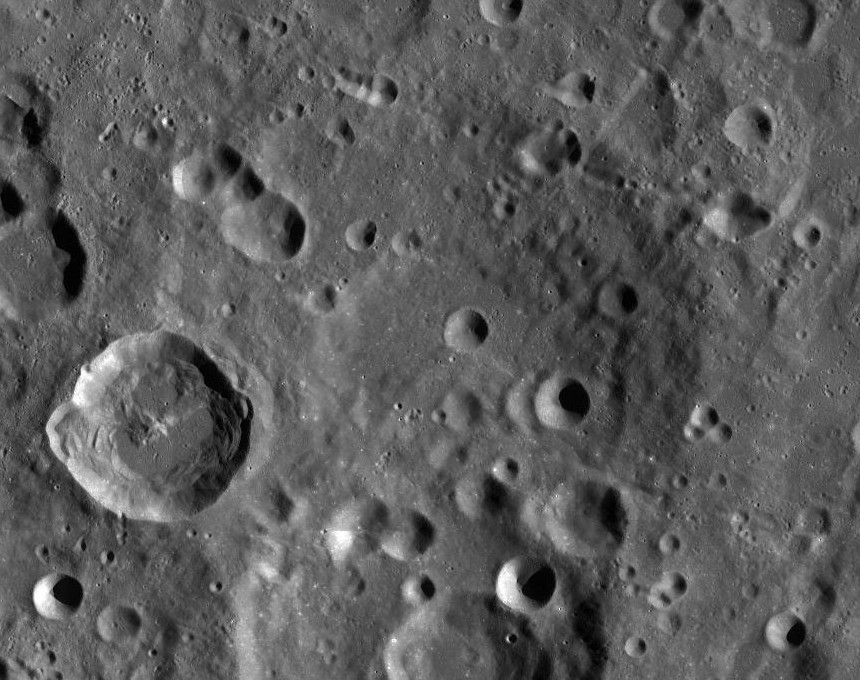
- LRO WAC image
- Coordinates: 13.5°S 139.8°W
- Diameter: 124 km
- Depth: Unknown
- Colongitude: 142° at sunrise
- Formation: Pre-Nectarian
- Eponym: Friedrich Paschen

Paschen is a lunar impact crater on the far side of the Moon. The relatively large satellite crater Paschen M partly overlies the southern rim of Paschen, and they nearly form a merged pair with only a section of irregular terrain along their common border. The smaller but well-formed crater Paschen S lies across the southwestern rim of Paschen. As a result, most of the southern rim of Paschen is now gone.

The remainder of the rim is not in much better condition. It is worn and eroded, with multiple small craterlets along the edge and inner wall. Most of the rim structure has been worn away by subsequent impacts and deposits of ejecta, and now forms a rounded dip into the curving interior. A small chain of craters cuts across the rim and inner wall to the west-northwest. There are several small craterlets in the southeastern part of the floor.

Paschen lies to the east of a larger walled plain called Galois, and to the southwest of the huge Hertzsprung. About half a crater diameter to the northeast of Paschen is Wan-Hoo. Farther to the north-northwest lies Sechenov.

== Satellite craters ==
By convention these features are identified on lunar maps by placing the letter on the side of the crater midpoint that is closest to Paschen.

Paschen	Latitude	Longitude	Diameter
G	14.3° S	135.4° W	29 km
H	16.0° S	135.6° W	27 km
K	17.9° S	138.9° W	57 km
L	16.4° S	139.5° W	38 km
M	16.1° S	140.0° W	94 km
S	14.5° S	142.0° W	48 km
U	13.2° S	143.0° W	29 km
