= First Rijeka Croatian Gymnasium =

Public high school in Rijeka, Croatia

- Prva riječka hrvatska gimnazija

Location
- Ulica Frana Kurelca 1 HR-51000 Rijeka; Croatia
- 45.3282°N 14.4416°E

Information
- Former names: Rijeka Gymnasium (1627); Croatian Real Gymnasium (1945); Real Gymnasium Rijeka (1946); First Gymnasium Rijeka (1949); Center for Specialized Education of Economic, Administrative, Mathematical and Informatics Personnel (1978); First Rijeka Croatian Gymnasium (1992)
- School type: Public, Gymnasium
- Established: 1627; 399 years ago
- Secondary years taught: 9–12
  - Grade 9: 154 (2024–25)
- Language: Croatian
- Website: Official website (in Croatian)
- Last updated: June 17, 2025

First Rijeka Croatian Gymnasium (Croatian: Prva riječka hrvatska gimnazija) is a high school in Rijeka, Croatia.

== Description ==
The school inherits the tradition of the original Jesuit gymnasium in Rijeka. It survived through a number of difficult historical periods, and was even formally abolished in 1896 when the Sušak gymnasium was left as the only Croatian gymnasium in the city, only restored after WWII, and in 1978 during the educational reforms under Stipe Šuvar, in turn restored after Croatian independence.

After the school year 2023/24, 101 graduates of this gymnasium enrolled at an institution of higher learning in Croatia, or 94.39% of students who took up the nationwide Matura exams. The most common destinations for these students were the University of Rijeka faculties of economics, medicine, maritime studies, humanities and social sciences, and engineering.
