= Mechnikov (crater) =

Crater on the Moon

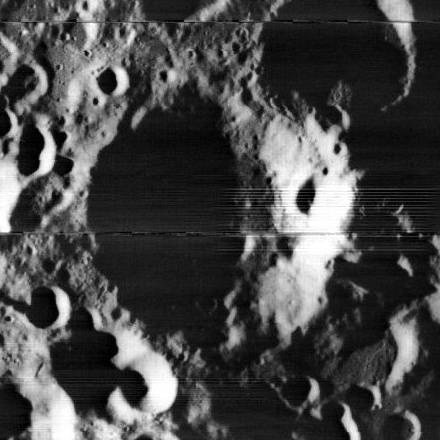
- Lunar Orbiter 1 image
- Coordinates: 11.0°S 149.0°W
- Diameter: 60 km
- Depth: Unknown
- Colongitude: 149° at sunrise
- Formation: Nectarian
- Eponym: Il'ya I. Mechnikov

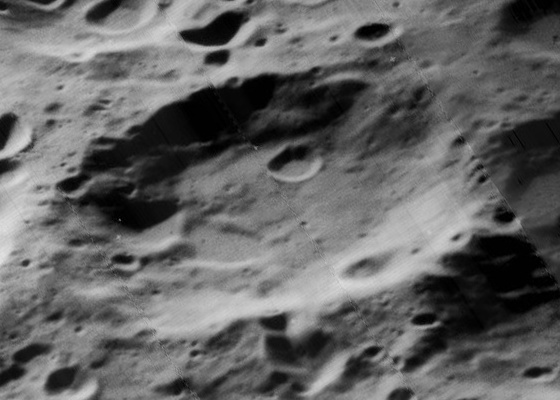
Oblique Lunar Orbiter 5 image

Mechnikov is an impact crater on the far side of the Moon. It is located just to the northeast of the much larger walled plain Galois, being separated by a stretch of irregular terrain about 20–30 km in width.

On the lunar geologic timescale, Mechnikov is a crater of Nectarian age. It is a roughly circular crater that has undergone a moderate amount of impact erosion, but is still relatively intact. Attached to the exterior along the northeast are the satellite craters Mechnikov C and Mechnikov D. There is a small crater in the western part of Mechnikov's interior floor.

A small crater along the northeast rim of Galois has a small ray system. Ray material from this crater crosses the interior of Mechnikov in a series of streaks that are radial to the impact, producing a fan-like appearance.

== Satellite craters ==
By convention these features are identified on lunar maps by placing the letter on the side of the crater midpoint that is closest to Mechnikov.

Mechnikov	Latitude	Longitude	Diameter
C	9.9° S	148.0° W	35 km
D	10.2° S	147.2° W	53 km
F	11.3° S	145.0° W	30 km
G	11.8° S	146.6° W	17 km
U	10.6° S	150.9° W	30 km
Z	9.3° S	149.2° W	21 km
