= Louis Paul Émile Richard =

French mathematician (1795-1849)

Louis Paul Émile Richard (31 March 1795 – 11 March 1849) was a French mathematician and teacher at the Collège Louis-le-Grand. Although he published nothing himself, he was known for his inspiring teaching and was one of the teachers of Évariste Galois.

Richard was born in Rennes where his father was an artillery colonel. A physical injury in childhood prevented him from following a military career. This made him become a mathematics teacher for military aspirants, first at the lycée at Douai, then at the Collège de Pontivy (from 1815), Collège Saint-Louis (from 1820) and finally the Collège Louis-le-Grand (from 1822). Students from the college typically went into the École Polytechnique and École Normale Supérieure. His students included Évariste Galois, Urbain Le Verrier, Joseph Serret, and Charles Hermite.
