= Sechenov (crater) =

Lunar crater

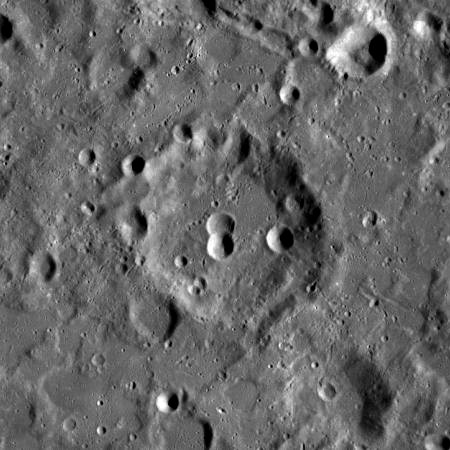
- LRO image
- Coordinates: 7.1°S 142.6°W
- Diameter: 62 km
- Depth: Unknown
- Colongitude: 144° at sunrise
- Formation: Nectarian
- Eponym: Ivan M. Sechenov

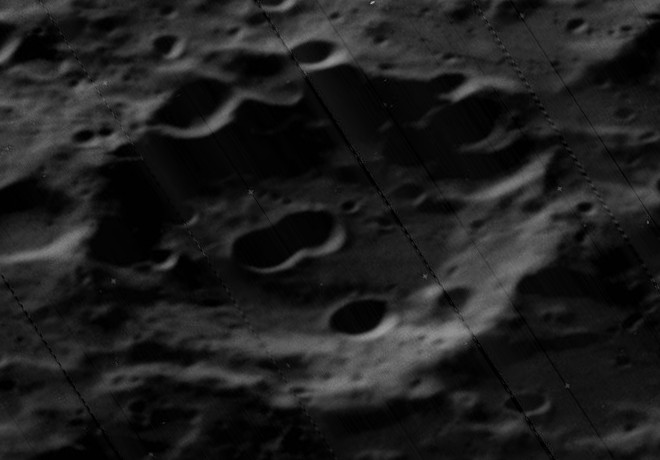
Oblique Lunar Orbiter 5 image

Sechenov is a lunar impact crater on the far side of the Moon. It lies to the southwest of the huge walled plain named Hertzsprung, and to the east-southeast of the crater Timiryazev. To the south-southeast of Sechenov lies Paschen.

This crater has taken a moderate amount of wear and tear as a result of subsequent impacts. The outer rim is somewhat worn and uneven. There is a small crater intruding into the southwestern outer rim. A joined pair of small craters is located in the middle of the interior floor, and there is a small craterlet along the eastern base of the inner wall.

Sechenov is a crater of Nectarian age.

== Satellite craters ==
By convention these features are identified on lunar maps by placing the letter on the side of the crater midpoint that is closest to Sechenov.

| Sechenov | Latitude | Longitude | Diameter |
|---|---|---|---|
| C | 5.2° S | 141.3° W | 19 km |
| P | 9.8° S | 143.8° W | 23 km |
