= Lacus Oblivionis =

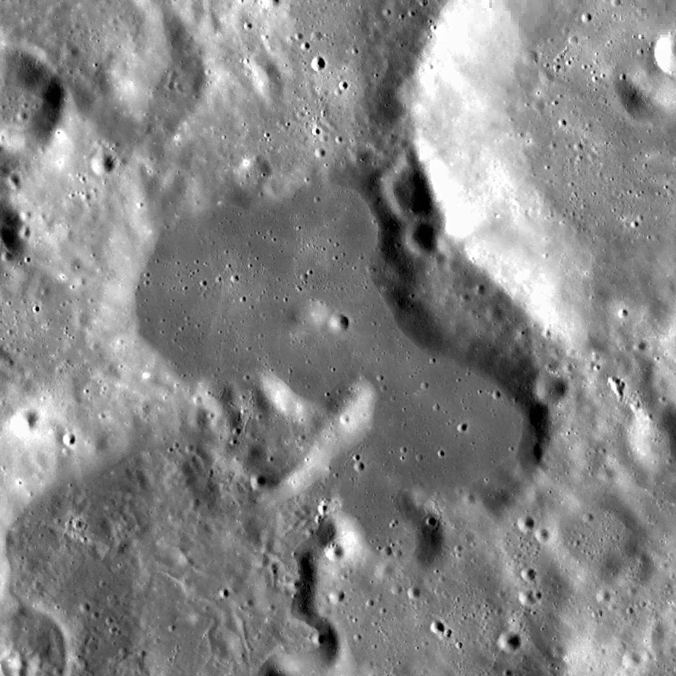
- LRO WAC image
- Coordinates: 21.0°S 168.0°W
- Diameter: 50 km
- Eponym: Lake of Forgetfulness

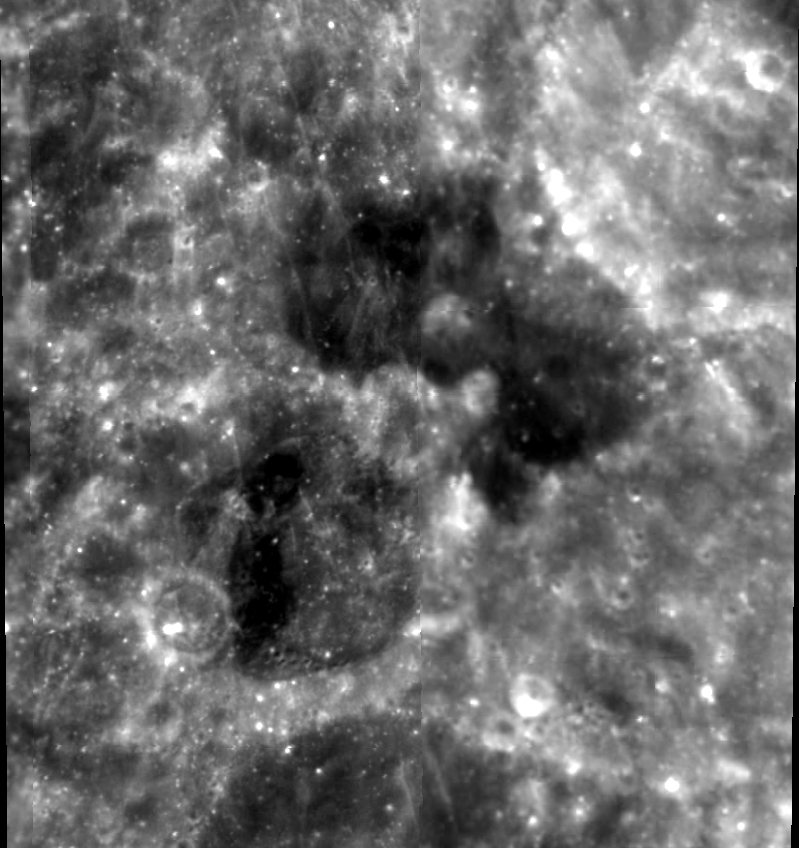
Clementine mosaic

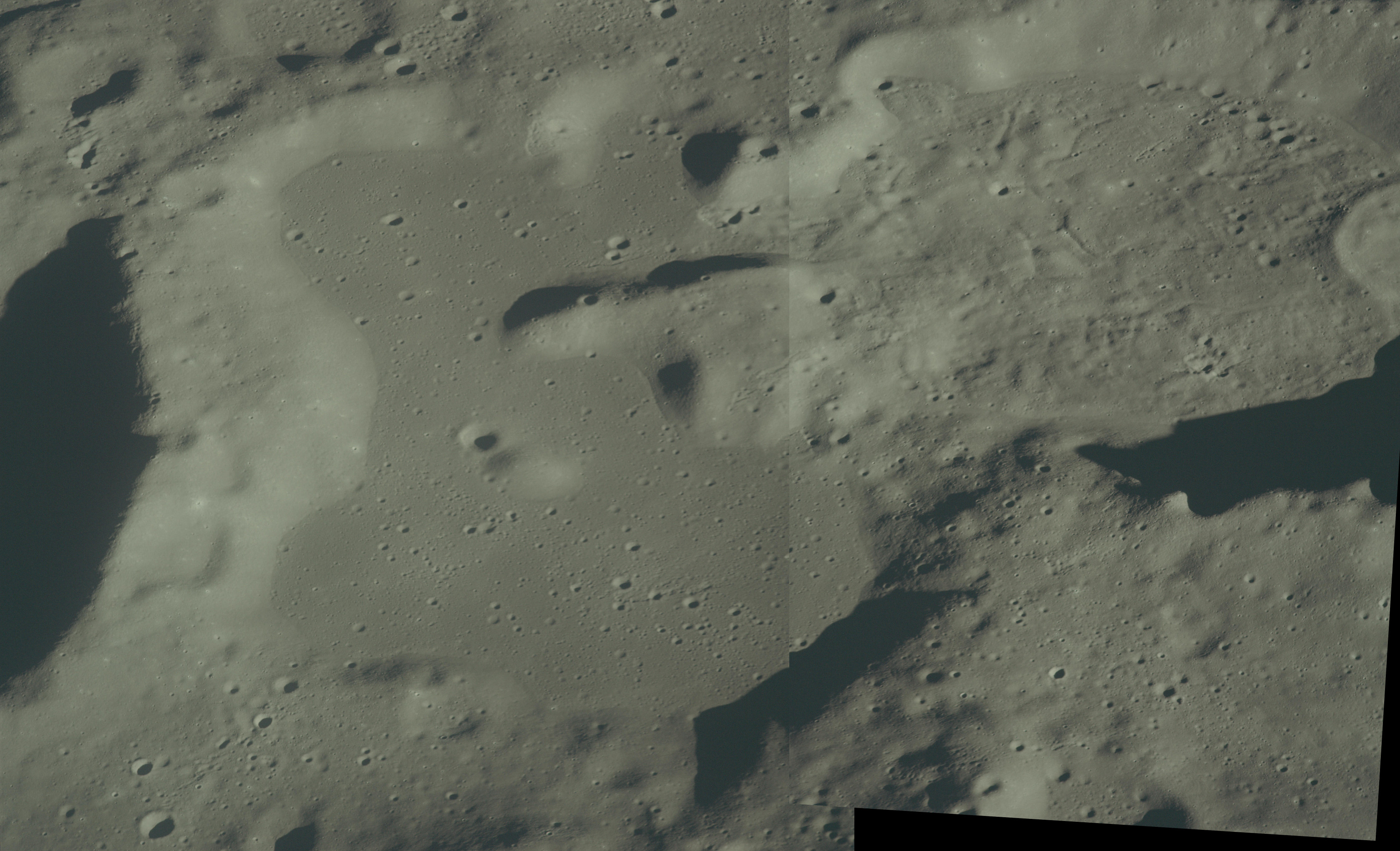
Mosaic from two Apollo 17 images, facing southeast

Lacus Oblivionis (Latin oblīviōnis, "Lake of Forgetfulness") is a small lunar mare on the surface of the Moon. It is located on the far side of the Moon at 21.0° S, 168.0° W and is 50 km in diameter. The name was adopted by the IAU in 1976.

The crater Mohorovičić R (satellite of Mohorovičić) lies to the northeast, and the crater Sniadecki Y (satellite of Sniadecki) lies to the southwest.
