= Galois (crater) =

Crater on the Moon

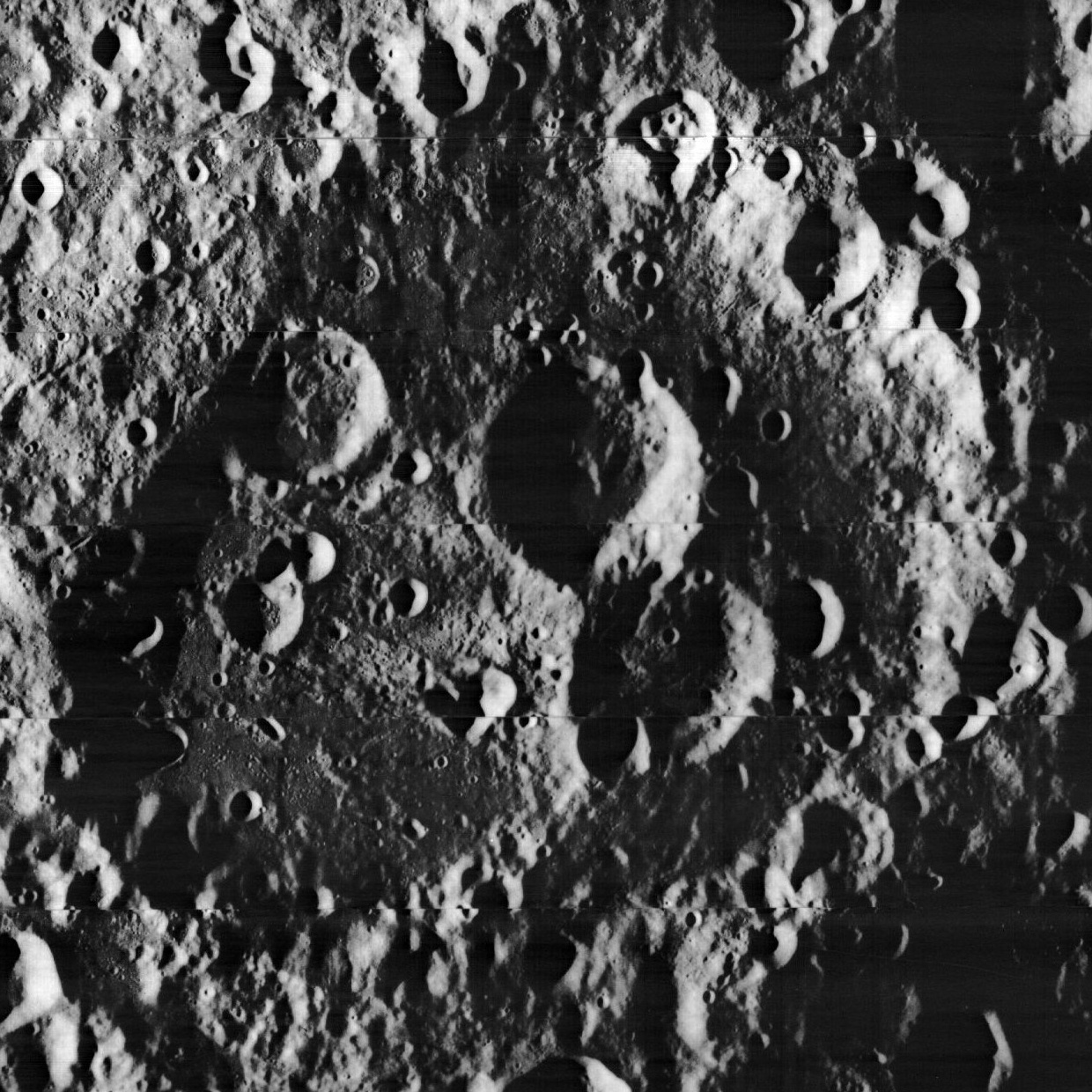
- Lunar Orbiter 1 image
- Coordinates: 14.2°S 151.9°W
- Diameter: 231.97 km (144.14 mi)
- Depth: Unknown
- Colongitude: 156° at sunrise
- Formation: Pre-Nectarian
- Eponym: Évariste Galois

Galois is a large lunar impact crater on the far side of the Moon. Features of this class are commonly termed walled plains, due to their appearance and dimension. It is located just to the southeast of another huge walled plain, Korolev, a formation nearly double the diameter of Galois. Several hundred kilometers due south is another enormous feature, Apollo.

This crater dates to the Pre-Nectarian period of the lunar geologic timescale. It is a heavily eroded feature with a rim that has been reshaped by impacts, particularly along the northwest edge where it lies near Korolev. An influx of material forms an inward bulge along the southern edge, which is impacted by Galois Q. The interior floor is overlain by several notable craters, with the craters Galois A and Galois L forming a nearly matching pair near the midpoint. Along the northeastern rim are Galois B and Galois C, while Galois U lies against the northwestern inner wall. The most intact and nearly level section of floor is along the southwestern part of the interior.

A small, unnamed impact crater located along the northeastern rim of Galois has a relatively high albedo and lies at the focus of a small ray system. The rays from this impact are the most prominent to the north, where they cross the floor of the crater Mechnikov. Craters that have a ray system are considered indicative of a relatively recent impact, as the rays are steadily erased by space weathering.

This formation is named after French mathematician Évariste Galois (1811-1832). Its designation was officially adopted by the International Astronomical Union in 1970.

== Satellite craters ==
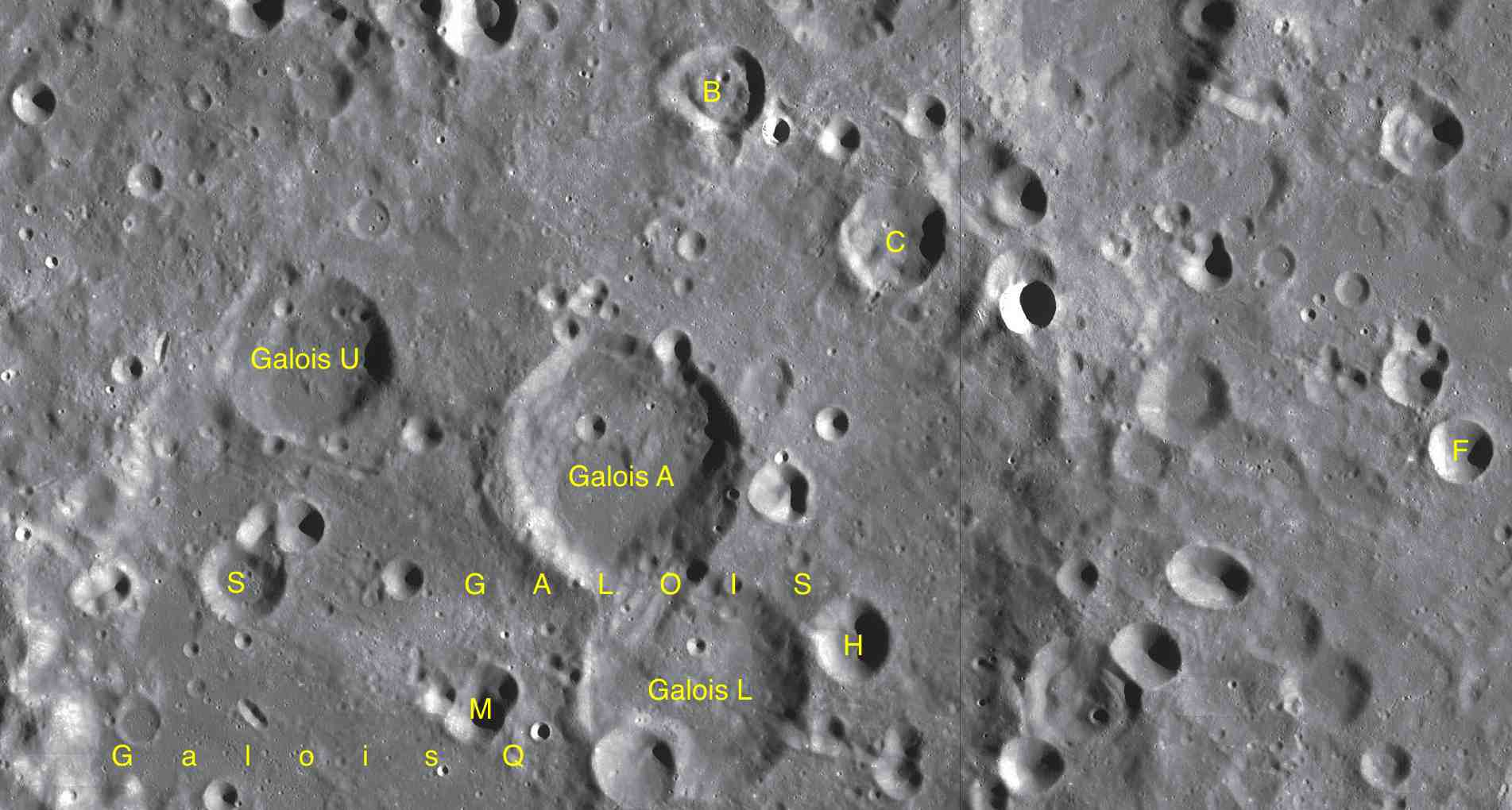
Galois satellite features and surroundings

By convention these features are identified on lunar maps by placing the letter on the side of the crater midpoint that is closest to Galois.

| Galois | Latitude | Longitude | Diameter |
|---|---|---|---|
| A | 14.0° S | 152.5° W | 54 km |
| B | 11.3° S | 151.8° W | 20 km |
| C | 12.4° S | 150.5° W | 22 km |
| F | 13.9° S | 146.4° W | 13 km |
| H | 15.2° S | 150.9° W | 19 km |
| L | 15.5° S | 152.0° W | 51 km |
| M | 16.1° S | 152.4° W | 18 km |
| Q | 15.2° S | 154.7° W | 132 km |
| S | 14.5° S | 154.9° W | 18 km |
| U | 13.2° S | 154.7° W | 35 km |

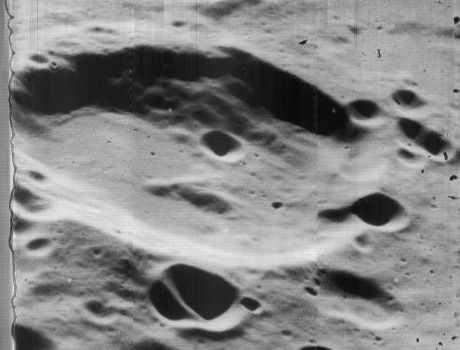
Oblique view of Galois A
