= Andrija Mohorovičić =

Croatian seismologist and geophysicist

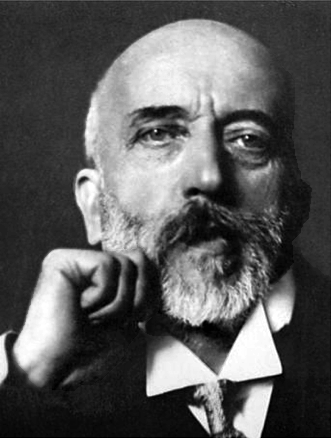
- Portrait of Andrija Mohorovičić
- Born: 23 January 1857; Opatija, Austrian Littoral, Austrian Empire
- Died: 18 December 1936 (aged 79); Zagreb, Sava Banovina, Kingdom of Yugoslavia
- Resting place: Mirogoj, Zagreb
- Education: Charles University in Prague
- Occupations: seismologist, meteorologist
- Known for: Eponym for the Mohorovičić discontinuity
- Spouse: Silvija Vernić

Andrija Mohorovičić (23 January 1857 – 18 December 1936) was a Croatian geophysicist and academic. He is best known for the eponymous Mohorovičić discontinuity and is considered one of the founders of modern seismology. He is also considered among the greatest Croatian natural scientists.

== Early years ==
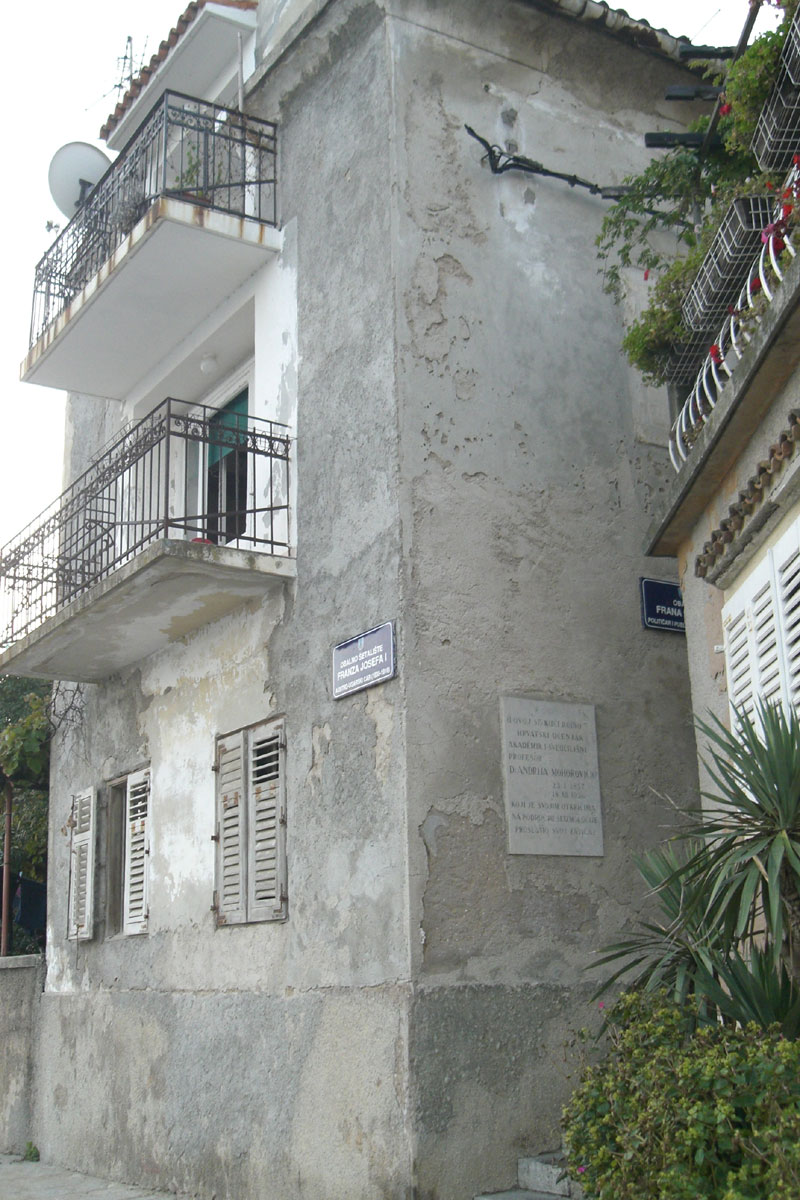
The house in Volosko where Mohorovičić was born

Mohorovičić was born in Volosko, Opatija, where his father (also named Andrija) was a blacksmith, specializing in making anchors. The younger Andrija also loved the sea and married a captain's daughter, Silvija Vernić, with whom he had four sons. Mohorovičić obtained his elementary education in his home town, then continued at the gymnasium of neighbouring Rijeka. He received his higher education in mathematics and physics at the Faculty of Philosophy in Prague in 1875, where one of his professors was Ernst Mach. At 15, Mohorovičić knew Italian, English and French. Later he learned German, Latin, and Ancient Greek.

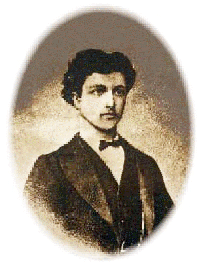
Mohorovičić c. 1880

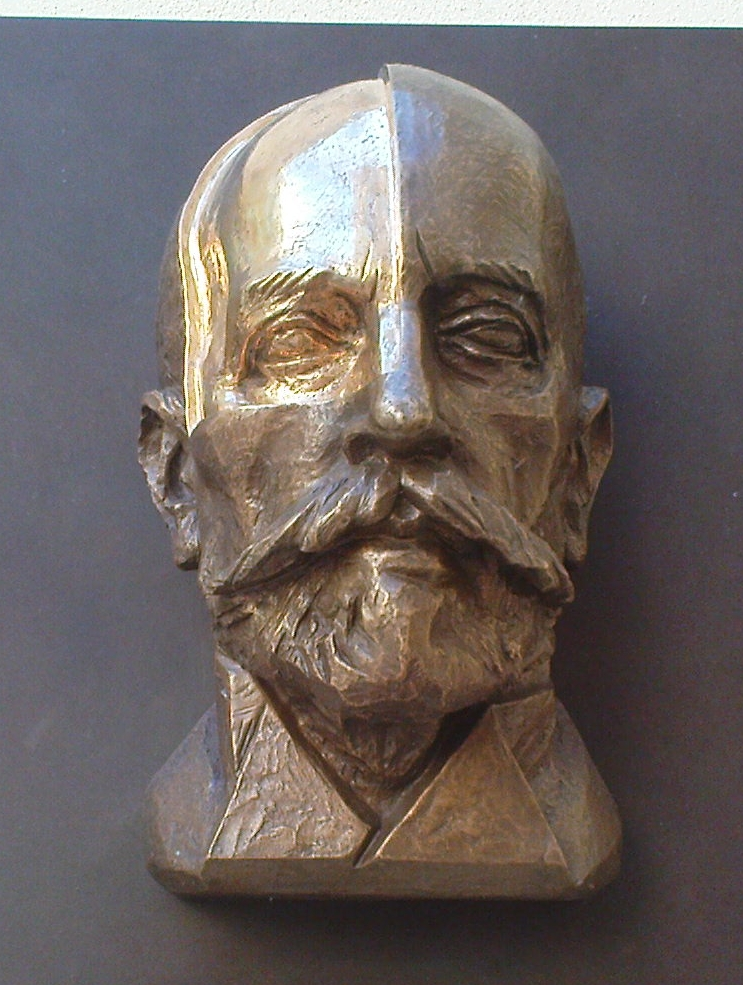
Detail of a commemorative plaque of Mohorovičić in Clementinum, Prague, Czech Republic

== Career in education ==
He taught first at high school in Zagreb (1879–1880), then at the gymnasium (secondary school) in Osijek. From 1882, he taught for nine years at the Royal Nautical School in Bakar, near Rijeka. Work started or completed there was important to his later scientific career. From 1893, when he became a corresponding member of the Faculty of Philosophy, University of Zagreb, to 1917–18 he taught in the fields of geophysics and astronomy. In 1898 he became a full member of what was then the Yugoslav Academy of Sciences and Arts in Zagreb, where he was a private docent. In 1910 he became a titular associate university professor.

== Meteorology ==
In Bakar he was first exposed to meteorology, which he taught at the Royal Nautical School. This influenced him to the extent that he founded the local meteorological station in 1887. He made systematic studies and both invented and constructed instruments to observe precipitation in Croatia and Slavonia. At his own request in 1891, he was transferred to the secondary school in Zagreb where, in 1892, he soon became a head of the Meteorological Observatory in Grič and established a service for all Croatia, while teaching geophysics and astronomy at the university.

On 13 March 1892, he observed the tornado in Novska, which picked up a 13-ton railway carriage with fifty passengers and threw it 30 m. He observed also the "vihor" (whirlwind) near Čazma in 1898 and studied the climate in Zagreb. Mohorovičić was the first person to describe atmospheric rotors with a horizontal axis, which he observed during bora-wind episodes in the northern Adriatic. In his last paper on meteorology (1901), he discussed the decrease in atmospheric temperature with height. His observations of clouds formed the basis of his doctoral thesis On the Observation of Clouds, the Daily and Annual Cloud Period in Bakar presented to the University of Zagreb and which earned him his degree as doctor of philosophy in 1893.

== Seismology ==
On 8 October 1909 an earthquake occurred with its epicenter in the Pokuplje region, 39 km southeast of Zagreb. A number of seismographs, installed beforehand, provided invaluable data, which led Mohorovičić to new discoveries. He concluded that when seismic waves strike the boundary between different types of material, they are reflected and refracted, just as light is when striking a prism, and that when earthquakes occur, two waves—longitudinal and transverse—propagate through the earth with different velocities. By analyzing data from more observation posts, Mohorovičić concluded that the Earth has several layers above a core. He was the first to establish, based on the evidence from seismic waves, the discontinuity that separates the Earth's crust from its mantle. This is now called the Mohorovičić discontinuity or (because of the complexity of that name) Moho. According to Mohorovičić, a layered structure would explain the observation of depths where seismic waves change speed and the difference in chemical composition between rocks from the crust and those from the mantle. From the data, he estimated the thickness of the upper layer (crust) to be 54 km. Geophysicists subsequently determined that the crust is 5–9 km below the ocean floor and 25–60 km below the continents, which rest on tectonic plates. Subsequent study of the Earth's interior confirmed the existence of the discontinuity under all continents and oceans.

Mohorovičić assumed that the velocity of seismic waves increases with the depth. The function he proposed to calculate the velocity of seismic waves is called the Mohorovičić law. He developed a method for determining earthquake epicenters and constructed curves giving the travel-times of seismic waves over distances of up to 10,000 miles from their source. He also proposed the construction of a new type of seismograph for recording ground horizontal movement, but due to lack of funds the project was never realized.

As early as 1909 Mohorovičić started giving lectures recommending standards that both architects and building contractors should follow - he was ahead of his time in setting some of the basic principles of earthquake-resistant design. Mohorovičić's theories were visionary and were only truly understood many years later from detailed observations of the effects of earthquakes on buildings, deep focus earthquakes, locating earthquake epicenters, Earth models, seismographs, harnessing the energy of the wind, hail-defence and other related elements of the geological body of knowledge known as geoscience.

== Legacy ==
His theories and proposals were the foundation of the "Zagreb school of seismology", which continued his work. Swedish seismologist M. Båth counted Mohorovičić along with 13 other names among the most important researchers in the field of seismology in the 1900-1936 period.

The crater Mohorovičić on the far side of the Moon is named in his honour (since 1970). The Croatian training ship Andrija Mohorovičić (1972) and the Andrija Mohorovičić Gymnasium in Rijeka, Croatia (1992) are named after him, as was the asteroid 8422 Mohorovičıć (in 1996).

In 1963, Yugoslavia issued a postage stamp in his honour on the occasion of the World Meteorological Day. On 23 April 2007, Croatian Post issued stamp in his honour, part of "Famous Croats" series. That same year, the Croatian Monetary Institute and the National Bank of Croatia issued a gold coin on the occasion of the 150th anniversary of his birth.

== Works ==
- A. Mohorovičić (1908). "Epicentri potresa u Hrvatskoj i Slavoniji" [Epicenters of earthquakes in Croatia and Slavonia]. Yearly Report of the Zagreb Meteorological Observatory for the Year 1906. Part IV (in Croatian). pp. 15–19.
- A. Mohorovičić (1910). "Epicentri potresa u Hrvatskoj i Slavoniji" [Epicenters of earthquakes in Croatia and Slavonia]. Yearly Report of the Zagreb Meteorological Observatory for the Year 1909 (in Croatian).
- A. Mohorovičić (1911). "Djelovanje potresa na zgrade" [The effects of earthquakes on buildings]. Vijesti Hrvatskog društva inženjera i arhitekata (in Croatian).
- A. Mohorovičić (1914). "Hodograph der normalen P-Wellen fur eine mittlere Herdtiefe". Beilage zu den Seismischen Aufzeichnungen (in German). Zagreb: Kraljevski zemaljski zavod za meteorologiju i geodinamiku.
- A. Mohorovičić (1914). "Hodograph der ersten longitudinalen Wellen eines Bebens (emersio undarum primarum)". Bulletin des travaux de l'Académie Yougoslave des Sciences et des Beaux-arts, Classe des sciences mathématiques et naturelles (in German). Vol. 2. pp. 139–157.
- A. Mohorovičić (1915). "Neue Phasen im Anfange des Bildes eines Bebens". Bulletin des travaux de l'Académie Yougoslave des Sciences et des Beaux-arts, Classe des sciences mathématiques et naturelles (in German). Vol. 4. pp. 65–86.
- A. Mohorovičić (1915). "Zu dem mittelitalienischen Beben vom 13. Jänner 1915. 2. Beilage zu den Seismischen Aufzeichnungen". Kraljevski zemaljski zavod za meteorologiju i geodinamiku (in German). Vol. 5. Zagreb.
- A. Mohorovičić (1915). "Zur Frage der Emergenzgeschwindigkeit. 1". Beilage zu den Seismischen Aufzeichnungen (in German). Vol. 4. Zagreb: Kraljevski zemaljski zavod za meteorologiju i geodinamiku.
- A. Mohorovičić (1915). "Zur Frage der Emergenzgeschwindigkeit. 1". Beilage zu den Seismischen Aufzeichnungen (in German). Vol. 4. Zagreb: Kraljevski zemaljski zavod za meteorologiju i geodinamiku.
- A. Mohorovičić (1916). "Die Bestimmung des Epizentrums eines Nahbebens". Gerlands Beiträge zur Geophysik (in German). Vol. 14. pp. 199–205.
- A. Mohorovičić (1916). "Die Bestimmung des Epizentrums eines Nahbebens". Gerlands Beiträge zur Geophysik (in German). Vol. 14. pp. 199–205.
- A. Mohorovičić (1916). "Vorlaufige Mitteilung uber das Beben vom 12. III. 1916". Berichte uber seismische Aufzeichnungen. Zagreb: Kraljevski zemaljski zavod za meteorologiju i geodinamiku.
- A. Mohorovičić (1917). "Principi konstrukcije sismografa i prijedlog za konstrukciju nova sismografa za horizontalne komponente gibanja zemlje" [Principles and construction of a seismograph, and a proposal for construction of a new seismograph for recording of horizontal component of ground motion]. Rad JAZU (in Croatian). Vol. 217. pp. 114–150.
- A. Mohorovičić; S.Mohorovičić (1922). "Hodografi longitudinalnih i transversalnih valova potresa (undae primae et undae secundae)). Part 1. Hodographs" [Hodographs of the longitudinal and transversal earthquake waves (undae primae et undae secundae)]. Rad JAZU (in Croatian). Vol. 226. pp. 94–190.
- A. Mohorovičić (1924). "A critical review of the seismic instruments used today and of the organisation of seismic service". Rad JAZU. Vol. 14. pp. 38–59.
- A. Mohorovičić (1925). "Hodographes des ondes normales P et S soulignees (Pn, P*, S*) et des deux premieres reflexions pour les profondeurs de l'hypocentre de 0, 25, 45, 57 kms". UGGI, Section de Seismologie, A. Travaux Scientifique (in French). Vol. 3. pp. 1–60.
- A. Mohorovičić (1926). "Zur Frage der wahren Empfindlichkeit eines Seismographen". Gerlands Beiträge zur Geophysik (in German). Vol. 15. pp. 201–214.

== See also ==
- Project Mohole
