= Korolev (lunar crater) =

Lunar impact crater

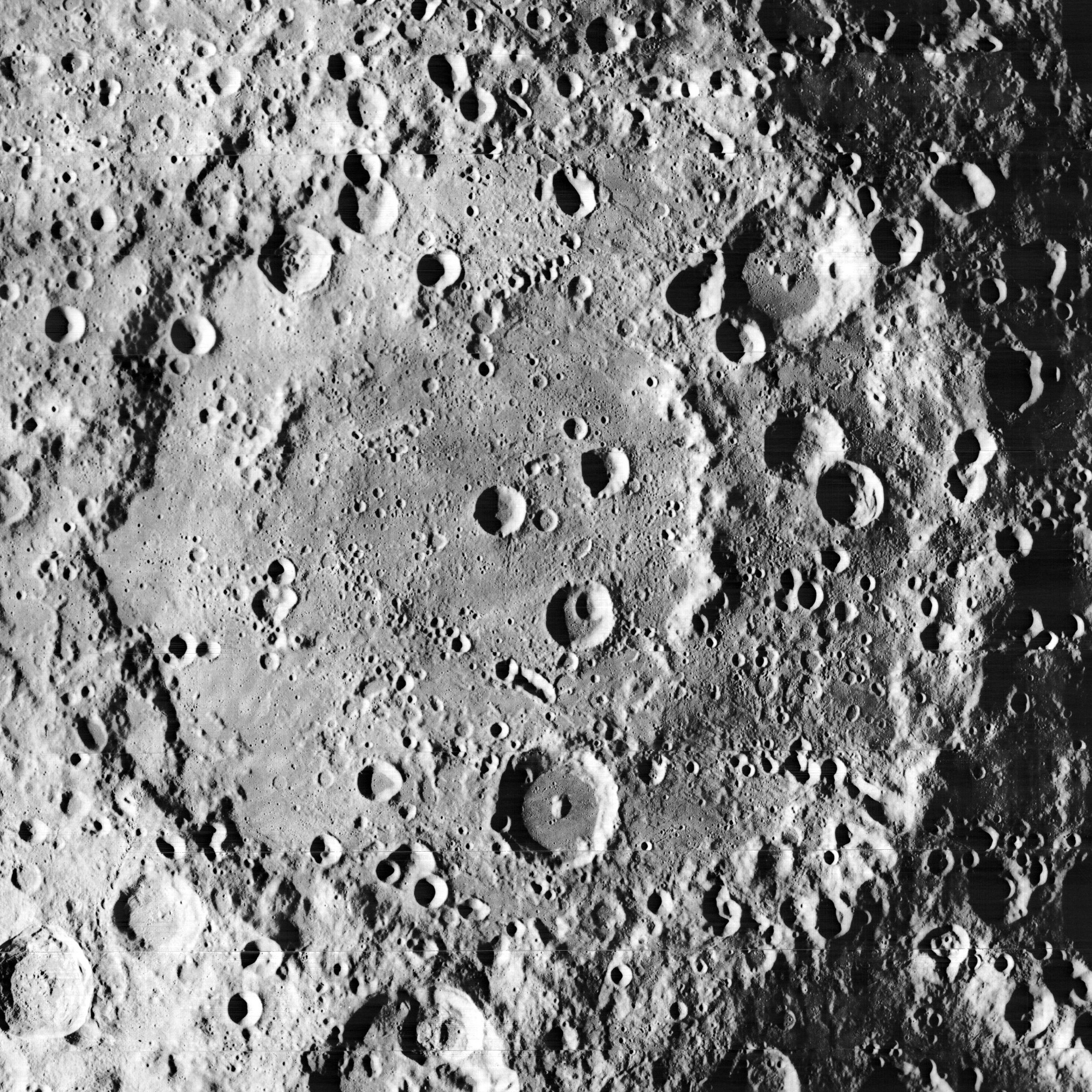
- The crater Korolev (center) imaged by NASA's Lunar Orbiter 1
- Coordinates: 4.0°S 157.4°W
- Diameter: 437 km
- Depth: 5.43 km (3.37 mi)
- Colongitude: 163° at sunrise
- Formation: Nectarian
- Eponym: Sergei Korolev

Korolev is a large lunar impact crater of the walled plain or basin type. This class of formation is known as a peak ring basin, which has a single interior topographic ring or a discontinuous ring of peaks with no central peak. It formed during the Nectarian period of the lunar geologic timescale.

This basin lies on the far side of the Moon, and the northern part of its floor crosses the lunar equator. Notable nearby craters include Galois just to the southeast, Das to the south-southeast, Doppler attached to the southern rim, and Kibal'chich to the northeast. Rays of the crater Crookes (to the southwest) cover parts of the basin.

The outer rim of Korolev is heavily worn and eroded, with a multitude of small craters lying across the wide rim and the low inner wall. The interior floor is relatively flat compared to the surrounding terrain, but is pock-marked with many craters of varying sizes. The most notable of these interior craters are Korolev M in the southern part of the floor, and Korolev D next to the northeast rim.

Within the interior of Korolev is the remains of a second, inner ring. This is roughly half the diameter of the outer wall, and is the most intact in the eastern half. Here it forms a curving arc of ridges across the floor. At the midpoint of the formation, there is nothing resembling a central peak. However the craters Korolev B, Korolev T, and Korolev L lie within the diameter of the inner ring.

A small crater to the southwest of Korolev L was a designated control point, CP-1, during the Apollo 8 mission. Measurements taken from orbit on this point improved the accuracy of mapping of the lunar far side, although they were likely surpassed by subsequent Apollo missions.

Korolev is named for Soviet rocket engineer Sergei Korolev. Until formal naming in 1970 by the IAU, the crater was known as Basin XV.

Korolev lies to the south of the similar-sized Dirichlet-Jackson Basin.

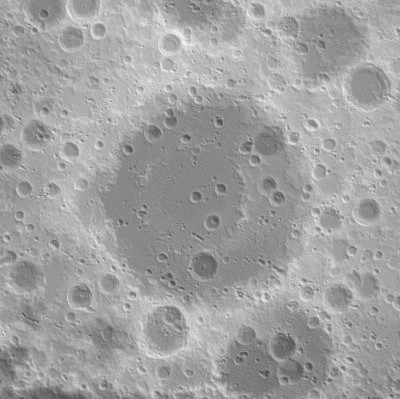
Topographic map

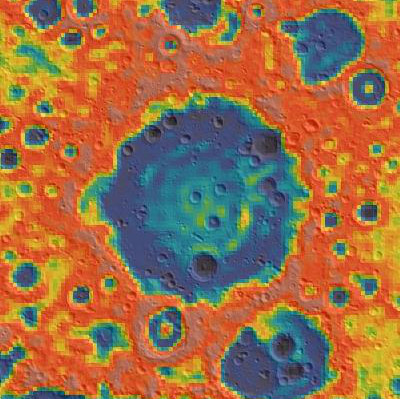
Gravity map based on GRAIL

== Views ==
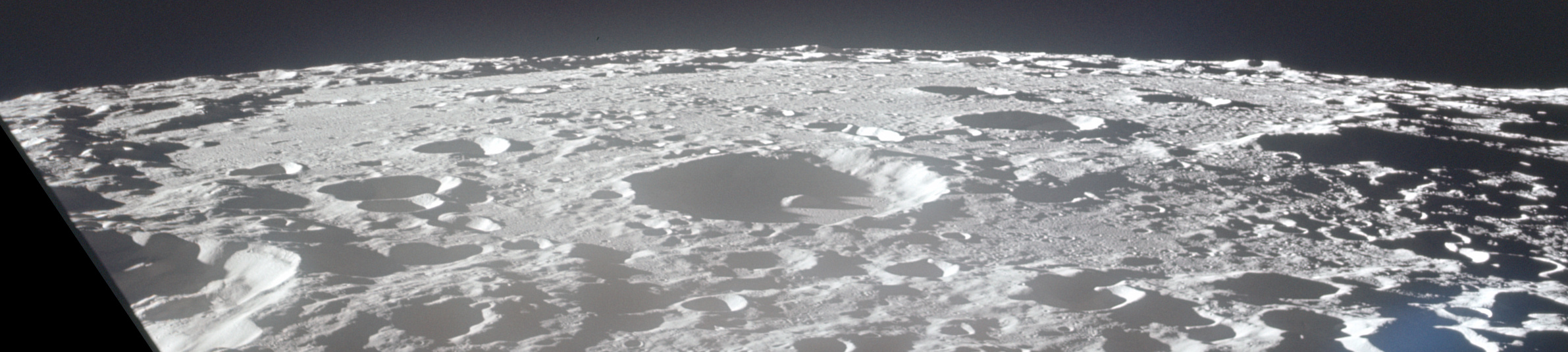
Oblique view of the 437 km wide basin Korolev, taken by Apollo 17 in 1972, facing north

== Satellite craters ==
By convention these features are identified on lunar maps by placing the letter on the side of the crater midpoint that is closest to Korolev.

Korolev	Coordinates	Diameter, km
B	3.66°S 156.29°W	21
C	0.73°S 153.22°W	66
D	0.48°S 151.75°W	24
E	3.43°S 153.38°W	37
F	4.25°S 152.74°W	30
G	5.67°S 153.46°W	12
L	5.74°S 156.81°W	31
M	8.50°S 157.37°W	57
P	7.93°S 159.94°W	18
T	4.14°S 157.84°W	22
V	1.21°S 162.06°W	19
W	0.18°S 160.53°W	31
X	0.56°N 159.44°W	27
Y	0.52°S 158.45°W	19
Z	1.15°N 159.48°W	18

== See also ==
- 1855 Korolev, minor planet
- Korolev (Martian crater)
