= Cantor (disambiguation) =

A cantor is a person who leads people in singing or sometimes in prayer.

Cantor may also refer to:

== Music ==
- Cantor (Christianity), the chief singer, and usually instructor, employed at a church
- Hazzan, a Jewish musician trained in the vocal arts who leads the congregation in songful prayer
- Cantor (music software), a vocal singing synthesizer software

== People ==
- Cantor (surname)
  - Georg Cantor (1845–1918), German mathematician
    - Cantor cube – Topological group
    - Cantor distribution – Probability distribution
    - Cantor function – Continuous function that is not absolutely continuous
    - Cantor Medal – Award in mathematics
    - Cantor set – Set of points on a line segment with certain topological properties
    - Cantor space – Topological space
    - Cantor's theorem (disambiguation)
  - Theodore Cantor (1809–1860), Danish zoologist and botanist after whom several species are named
  - David G. Cantor (1935–2012), American mathematician
    - Cantor–Zassenhaus algorithm – Algorithm for factoring polynomials over finite fields

== Places ==
- Cantor, New Brunswick, Canada

== Science and technology ==
- 16246 Cantor, asteroid
- Cantor (crater), a lunar crater
- Cantor (mathematics software), a free software mathematics application for scientific statistics and analysis
- Cantor, a trade name for the drug Minaprine

== See also ==
- Precentor, a person who helps facilitate worship
