= Berlekamp–Zassenhaus algorithm =

In mathematics, in particular in computational algebra, the Berlekamp–Zassenhaus algorithm is an algorithm for factoring polynomials over the integers. As a consequence of Gauss's lemma, this amounts to solving the problem also over the rationals.

The algorithm starts by finding factorizations over suitable finite fields using Hensel's lemma to lift the solution from modulo a prime p to a convenient power of p. After this the right factors are found as a subset of these. The worst case of this algorithm is exponential in the number of factors. The algorithm is named after Elwyn Berlekamp and Hans Zassenhaus; it combines Berlekamp's algorithm for factorization of polynomials over finite fields with a method of Zassenhaus for applying this to polynomial factorization over Dedekind domains.

A later method, the Cantor-Zassenhaus algorithm, improves on the part of the algorithm involving factorization over finite fields. Van Hoeij (2002) found another improvement by using the LLL algorithm, substantially reducing the time needed to choose the right subsets of mod p factors.
