= Minimal polynomial (field theory) =

Concept in abstract algebra

In field theory, a branch of mathematics, the minimal polynomial of an element $\alpha$ of an extension field of a field is, roughly speaking, the polynomial of lowest degree having coefficients in the smaller field, such that $\alpha$ is a root of the polynomial. If the minimal polynomial of $\alpha$ exists, it is unique. The coefficient of the highest-degree term in the polynomial is required to be 1.

More formally, a minimal polynomial is defined relative to a field extension $E/F$ and an element of the extension field $E/F$. The minimal polynomial of an element, if it exists, is a member of $F[x]$, the ring of polynomials in the variable $x$ with coefficients in $F$. Given an element $\alpha$ of $E$, let $J_{\alpha}$ be the set of all polynomials $f(x)$ in $F[x]$ such that $f(\alpha) = 0$. The element $\alpha$ is called a root or zero of each polynomial in $J_{\alpha}$.

More specifically, $J_{\alpha}$ is the kernel of the ring homomorphism from $F[x]$ to $E$ which sends polynomials $g$ to their value $g(\alpha)$ at the element $\alpha$. Because it is the kernel of a ring homomorphism, $J_{\alpha}$ is an ideal of the polynomial ring $F[x]$: it is closed under polynomial addition and subtraction (hence containing the zero polynomial), as well as under multiplication by elements of $F$ (which is scalar multiplication if $F[x]$ is regarded as a vector space over $F$).

The zero polynomial, all of whose coefficients are 0, is in every $J_{\alpha}$ since $0\alpha^{i} = 0$ for all $\alpha$ and $i$. This makes the zero polynomial useless for classifying different values of $\alpha$ into types, so it is excepted. If there are any non-zero polynomials in $J_{\alpha}$, i.e. if the latter is not the zero ideal, then $\alpha$ is called an algebraic element over $F$, and there exists a monic polynomial of least degree in $J_{\alpha}$. This is the minimal polynomial of $\alpha$ with respect to $E/F$. It is unique and irreducible over $F$. If the zero polynomial is the only member of $J_{\alpha}$, then $\alpha$ is called a transcendental element over $F$ and has no minimal polynomial with respect to $E/F$.

Minimal polynomials are useful for constructing and analyzing field extensions. When $\alpha$ is algebraic with minimal polynomial $f(x)$, the smallest field that contains both $F$ and $\alpha$ is isomorphic to the quotient ring $F[x]/\langle f(x)\rangle$, where $\langle f(x)\rangle$ is the ideal of $F[x]$ generated by $f(x)$. Minimal polynomials are also used to define conjugate elements.

== Definition ==
Let $E/F$ be a field extension, $\alpha$ an element of $E$, and $F[x]$ the ring of polynomials in $x$ over $F$. The element $\alpha$ has a minimal polynomial when $\alpha$ is algebraic over $F$, that is, when $f(\alpha) = 0$ for some non-zero polynomial $f(x)$ in $F[x]$. Then the minimal polynomial of $\alpha$ is defined as the monic polynomial of least degree among all polynomials in $F[x]$ having $\alpha$ as a root.

== Properties ==
Throughout this section, let $E/F$ be a field extension over $F$ as above, let $\alpha \in E$ be an algebraic element over $F$ and let $J_{\alpha}$ be the ideal of polynomials vanishing on $\alpha$.

=== Uniqueness ===
The minimal polynomial $f$ of $\alpha$ is unique.

To prove this, suppose that $f$ and $g$ are monic polynomials in $J_{\alpha}$ of minimal degree $n > 0$. We have that $r := f - g \in J_{\alpha}$ (because the latter is closed under addition/subtraction) and that $m := \deg(r) < n$ (because the polynomials are monic of the same degree). If $r$ is not zero, then $r / c_m$ (writing $c_m \in F$ for the non-zero coefficient of highest degree in $r$) is a monic polynomial of degree $m < n$ such that $r / c_m \in J_{\alpha}$ (because the latter is closed under multiplication/division by non-zero elements of $F$), which contradicts our original assumption of minimality for $n$. We conclude that $0 = r = f - g$, i.e. that $f = g$.

=== Irreducibility ===
The minimal polynomial $f$ of $\alpha$ is irreducible, i.e. it cannot be factorized as $f = gh$ for two polynomials $g$ and $h$ of strictly lower degree.

To prove this, first observe that any factorization $f = gh$ implies that either $g(\alpha) = 0$ or $h(\alpha) = 0$, because $f(\alpha) = 0$ and $F$ is a field (hence also an integral domain). Choosing both $g$ and $h$ to be of degree strictly lower than $f$ would then contradict the minimality requirement on $f$, so $f$ must be irreducible.

=== Minimal polynomial generates $J_{\alpha}$ ===
The minimal polynomial $f$ of $\alpha$ generates the ideal $J_{\alpha}$, i.e. every $g$ in $J_{\alpha}$ can be factorized as $g = fh$ for some $h$ in $F[x]$.

To prove this, it suffices to observe that $F[x]$ is a principal ideal domain, because $F$ is a field: this means that every ideal $I$ in $F[x]$, $J_{\alpha}$ amongst them, is generated by a single element $f$. With the exception of the zero ideal $I = \{0\}$, the generator $f$ must be non-zero and it must be the unique polynomial of minimal degree, up to a factor in $F$ (because the degree of $fg$ is strictly larger than that of $f$ whenever $g$ is of degree greater than zero). In particular, there is a unique monic generator $f$, and all generators must be irreducible. When $I$ is chosen to be $J_{\alpha}$, for $\alpha$ algebraic over $F$, then the monic generator $f$ is the minimal polynomial of $\alpha$.

== Examples ==
=== Minimal polynomial of a Galois field extension ===
Given a Galois extension $L/K$, the minimal polynomial of any $\alpha \in L$ not in $K$ can be computed as
$$f(x) = \prod_{\sigma \in \text{Gal}(L/K)} (x - \sigma(\alpha))$$
if $\alpha$ has no stabilizers in the Galois action. Since it is irreducible, which can be deduced by looking at the roots of $f'$, it is the minimal polynomial. Note that the same kind of formula can be found by replacing $G = \text{Gal}(L/K)$ with $G/N$ where $N = \text{Stab}(\alpha)$ is the stabilizer group of $\alpha$. For example, if $\alpha \in K$ then its stabilizer is $G$, hence $(x - \alpha)$ is its minimal polynomial.

=== Quadratic field extensions ===
==== Q(√2) ====
If $F = \mathbb{Q}$, $E = \mathbb{R}$, $\alpha = \sqrt{2}$, then the minimal polynomial for $\alpha$ is $a(x) = x^2 - 2$. The base field $F$ is important as it determines the possibilities for the coefficients of $a(x)$. For instance, if we take $F = \mathbb{R}$, then the minimal polynomial for $\alpha = \sqrt{2}$ is $a(x) = x - \sqrt{2}$.

==== Q(√d) ====
In general, for the quadratic extension given by a square-free $d$, computing the minimal polynomial of an element $a + b\sqrt{d\,}$ can be found using Galois theory. Then
$$\begin{align}
f(x) &= (x - (a + b\sqrt{d\,}))(x - (a - b\sqrt{d\,})) \\
&= x^2 - 2ax + (a^2 - b^2d)
\end{align}$$
in particular, this implies $2a \in \mathbb{Z}$ and $a^2 - b^2d \in \mathbb{Z}$. This can be used to determine $\mathcal{O}_{\mathbb{Q}(\sqrt{d\,}\!\!\!\;\;)}$ through a series of relations using modular arithmetic.

=== Biquadratic field extensions ===
If $\alpha = \sqrt{2} + \sqrt{3}$, then the minimal polynomial in $\mathbb{Q}[x]$ is $a(x) = x^4 - 10x^2 + 1 = (x - \sqrt{2} - \sqrt{3})(x + \sqrt{2} - \sqrt{3})(x - \sqrt{2} + \sqrt{3})(x + \sqrt{2} + \sqrt{3})$.

Notice if $\alpha = \sqrt{2}$ then the Galois action on $\sqrt{3}$ stabilizes $\alpha$. Hence the minimal polynomial can be found using the quotient group $\text{Gal}(\mathbb{Q}(\sqrt{2},\sqrt{3})/\mathbb{Q})/\text{Gal}(\mathbb{Q}(\sqrt{3})/\mathbb{Q})$.

=== Roots of unity ===
The minimal polynomials in $\mathbb{Q}[x]$ of roots of unity are the cyclotomic polynomials. The roots of the minimal polynomial of 2cos(2π/n) are twice the real part of the primitive roots of unity.

=== Swinnerton-Dyer polynomials ===
The minimal polynomial in $\mathbb{Q}[x]$ of the sum of the square roots of the first $n$ prime numbers is constructed analogously, and is called a Swinnerton-Dyer polynomial.

== See also ==
- Ring of integers
- Algebraic number field
- Minimal polynomial (linear algebra)
