= Elwyn Berlekamp =

American mathematician (1940–2019)

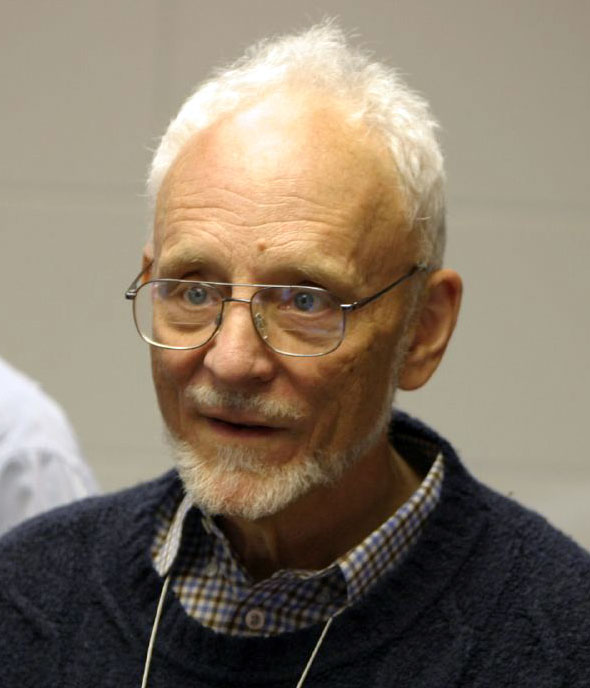
- Berlekamp in 2005
- Born: Elwyn Ralph Berlekamp; September 6, 1940; Dover, Ohio, U.S.
- Died: April 9, 2019 (aged 78); Piedmont, California, U.S.
- Education: Massachusetts Institute of Technology
- Known for: Berlekamp's algorithm Berlekamp switching game Berlekamp–Welch algorithm Berlekamp–Massey algorithm Berlekamp–Rabin algorithm Berlekamp–Zassenhaus algorithm Berlekamp–Van Lint–Seidel graph Blockbusting; Combinatorial game theory Cooling and heating Coupon Go; Error-correcting codes with feedback Partisan game Phutball
- Awards: IEEE Richard W. Hamming Medal (1991); Claude E. Shannon Award (1993)
- Scientific career
- Fields: Information theory, Coding theory, Combinatorial game theory
- Workplaces: University of California, Berkeley
- Thesis: Block coding with noiseless feedback (1964)
- Doctoral advisor: Robert G. Gallager
- Doctoral students: Julia Kempe
- Other notable students: Ken Thompson

Elwyn Ralph Berlekamp (September 6, 1940 – April 9, 2019) was a professor of mathematics and computer science at the University of California, Berkeley. Berlekamp was widely known for his work in computer science, coding theory and combinatorial game theory.

Berlekamp invented an algorithm to factor polynomials and the Berlekamp switching game, and was one of the inventors of the Berlekamp–Welch algorithm and the Berlekamp–Massey algorithms, which are used to implement Reed–Solomon error correction. He also co-invented the Berlekamp–Rabin algorithm, Berlekamp–Zassenhaus algorithm, and the Berlekamp–Van Lint–Seidel graph.

== Life and education ==
Berlekamp was born in 1940, in Dover, Ohio, the son of Waldo Berlekamp and Loretta Kimmel Berlekamp. Waldo was of German descent and a reverend in the United Church of Christ.

His family moved to Northern Kentucky, where from 1954 Berlekamp attended Fort Thomas Highlands High School in Fort Thomas, Kentucky. He was elected class president and joined the swim team which practiced naked at the local YMCA pool; Berlekamp was the slowest swimmer but chose swimming because of the low level of competition compared to other sports. He decided to attend the Massachusetts Institute of Technology (MIT) after learning it did not have an American football team. At MIT, his freshman professors included John Forbes Nash Jr. and he was a Putnam Fellow during his senior year in 1961. He completed his bachelor's and master's degrees in electrical engineering in 1962. Berlekamp did internships at Bell Labs in 1960 and 1962, where his boss was John Larry Kelly Jr. Continuing his studies at MIT, he finished his Ph.D. in electrical engineering in 1964; his advisors were Robert G. Gallager, Peter Elias, Claude Shannon, and John Wozencraft.

Berlekamp met his wife, Jennifer Wilson, in 1964 after juggling in his apartment and having to apologize for causing a noise disturbance. They had two daughters and a son. He lived in Piedmont, California and died in April 2019 at the age of 78 from complications of pulmonary fibrosis.

== Career ==
Berlekamp was a professor of electrical engineering at the University of California, Berkeley from 1964 until 1966, when he became a mathematics researcher at Bell Labs. In 1971, Berlekamp returned to Berkeley as professor of mathematics and computer science, where he served as the advisor for over twenty doctoral students.

From 1986 Berlekamp consulted for Axcom, the firm that ran all trading for Jim Simons's Medallion Fund. After a slump in Axcom’s performance, he bought out the founder’s controlling interest in 1989, became president, and moved the company to Berkeley. He worked with Simons, Sandor Straus and Henry Laufer to overhaul the trading system, achieved a 55.9% net gain in 1990, and then sold his shares to Simons for six times what he had paid 16 months earlier.

He was a member of the National Academy of Engineering (1977) and the National Academy of Sciences (1999). He was elected a Fellow of the American Academy of Arts and Sciences in 1996, and became a fellow of the American Mathematical Society in 2012. In 1991, he received the IEEE Richard W. Hamming Medal, and in 1993, the Claude E. Shannon Award. In 1998, he received a Golden Jubilee Award for Technological Innovation from the IEEE Information Theory Society. Along with Tom M. Rodgers he was one of the founders of Gathering 4 Gardner and was on its board for many years. In the mid-1980s, he was president of Cyclotomics, Inc., a corporation that developed error-correcting code technology.

He studied various games, including dots and boxes, fox and geese, and, especially, Go. Berlekamp and co-author David Wolfe described methods for analyzing certain classes of Go endgames in the book Mathematical Go.

== Coding Theory and other mathematics ==
Berlekamp’s most recognized contribution to coding theory was an efficient iterative algorithm for decoding BCH and Reed–Solomon codes, which he presented in 1967 and set out in full in his 1968 textbook Algebraic Coding Theory. In 1969 James Massey showed that Berlekamp’s iterative BCH decoding algorithm also solves the general problem of finding the shortest linear-feedback shift register that generates a given finite sequence, a method now known as the Berlekamp–Massey algorithm.

Through Cyclotomics, the company he founded to implement his codes, his bit-serial encoders and decoders became the NASA standard for space communications and are still in use on Voyager 1 and 2. The Hubble Space Telescope communication system also uses Reed–Solomon codes with Berlekamp decoding, as do all compact disc players.

His 1967 algorithm for factoring polynomials over finite fields reduces the factorization of a degree-m polynomial over GF(q) to solving a system of roughly m(q−1)/q linear equations. It was the first technique for this problem, for many years the most efficient one, and is still used in cryptography.

== Berlekamp and Martin Gardner ==
Berlekamp was a member of the group of people around the Scientific American columnist Martin Gardner, a close friend. Berlekamp teamed up with John Horton Conway and Richard K. Guy, two other close associates of Gardner, to co-author the book Winning Ways for your Mathematical Plays, leading to his recognition as one of the founders of combinatorial game theory. The dedication of their book says, "To Martin Gardner, who has brought more mathematics to more millions than anyone else."

Berlekamp and Gardner both supported recreational mathematics. Conferences called Gathering 4 Gardner (G4G) are held every two years to celebrate the Gardner legacy. Berlekamp was one of the founders of G4G and was on its board of directors for many years.

== Selected publications ==
- Block coding with noiseless feedback. Thesis, Massachusetts Institute of Technology, Dept. of Electrical Engineering, 1964.
- Algebraic Coding Theory, New York: McGraw-Hill, 1968. Revised ed., Aegean Park Press, 1984, ISBN 0-89412-063-8.
- (with John Horton Conway and Richard K. Guy) Winning Ways for your Mathematical Plays.
  - 1st edition, New York: Academic Press, 2 vols., 1982; vol. 1, hardback: ISBN 0-12-091150-7, paperback: ISBN 0-12-091101-9; vol. 2, hardback: ISBN 0-12-091152-3, paperback: ISBN 0-12-091102-7.
  - 2nd edition, Wellesley, Massachusetts: A. K. Peters Ltd., 4 vols., 2001–2004; vol. 1: ISBN 1-56881-130-6; vol. 2: ISBN 1-56881-142-X; vol. 3: ISBN 1-56881-143-8; vol. 4: ISBN 1-56881-144-6.
- (with David Wolfe) Mathematical Go. Wellesley, Massachusetts: A. K. Peters Ltd., 1994. ISBN 1-56881-032-6.
- The Dots-and-Boxes Game. Natick, Massachusetts: A. K. Peters Ltd., 2000. ISBN 1-56881-129-2.

== See also ==
- Berlekamp switching game
- Berlekamp–Zassenhaus algorithm
