= David Wolfe (mathematician) =

Combinatorial game theorist and Go player

- Education: Cornell University; UC Berkeley College of Engineering
- Scientific career
- Fields: Mathematics
- Workplaces: University of California, Berkeley; Gustavus Adolphus College; Dalhousie University

David Wolfe is a mathematician and amateur Go player.

== Education and career ==
Wolfe graduated from Cornell University in 1985, with a bachelor's degree in electrical engineering. He obtained a Ph.D. in computer science from the University of California, Berkeley in 1994, with a dissertation Mathematics of Go: Chilling Corridors combining both subjects and supervised by Elwyn Berlekamp.

After working as a lecturer at the University of California, Berkeley from 1991 to 1996, as an associate professor at Gustavus Adolphus College from 1996 to 2008, and then as an adjunct faculty member at Dalhousie University, he moved from academia to the software industry. Wolfe was a fan of Martin Gardner and in 2009 he teamed up with Tom M. Rodgers to edit a Gardner tribute book.

== Books ==
Wolfe is the author of books on combinatorial game theory, including:

- Mathematical Go: Chilling Gets the Last Point (with Elwyn Berlekamp, A K Peters, 1994; also published as Mathematical Go Endgames: Nightmares for the Professional Go Player, Ishi Press, 1994)
- Lessons in Play: An Introduction to Combinatorial Game Theory (with Michael H. Albert and Richard Nowakowski, A K Peters, 2007; 2nd ed., CRC Press, 2019)
