= Lights Out (game) =

1995 electronic game

Selecting a square changes it and the surrounding squares.

Lights Out is an electronic game released by Tiger Electronics in 1995. The game consists of a 5 by 5 grid of lights. When the game starts, a random number or a stored pattern of these lights is switched on. Pressing any of the lights will toggle it and the adjacent lights. The goal of the puzzle is to switch all the lights off, preferably with as few button presses as possible.

Merlin, a similar electronic game, was released by Parker Brothers in the 1970s with similar rules on a 3 by 3 grid. Another similar game was produced by Vulcan Electronics in 1983 under the name XL-25. Tiger Toys also produced a cartridge version of Lights Out for its Game com handheld game console in 1997, shipped free with the console. A number of new puzzles similar to Lights Out have been released, such as Lights Out 2000 (5×5 with multiple colors), Lights Out Cube (six 3×3 faces with effects across edges), and Lights Out Deluxe (6×6).

== Inventors ==
Lights Out was created by a group of people including Avi Olti, Gyora Benedek, Zvi Herman, Revital Blumberg, Avi Weiner and Michael Ganor. The members of the group together and individually also invented several other games, such as Hidato, NimX, iTop and many more.

== Gameplay ==
Lights to toggle to turn off a fully-lit 5×5 board

Interactive Lights Out game.

The game consists of a 5 by 5 grid of lights. When the game starts, a random number or a stored pattern of these lights is switched on. Pressing any of the lights will toggle it and the four adjacent lights. The goal of the puzzle is to switch all the lights off, preferably in as few button presses as possible.

=== Mathematics ===
If a light is on, it must be toggled an odd number of times to be turned off. If a light is off, it must be toggled an even number of times (including none at all) for it to remain off. Several conclusions are used for the game's strategy. Firstly, the order in which the lights are pressed does not matter, as the result will be the same. Secondly, in a minimal solution, each light needs to be pressed no more than once, because pressing a light twice is equivalent to not pressing it at all.

In 1998, Marlow Anderson and Todd Feil used linear algebra to prove that not all configurations are solvable and also to prove that there are exactly four winning scenarios, not including redundant moves, for any solvable 5×5 problem. The 5×5 grid of Lights Out can be represented as a 25x1 column vector with a 1 and 0 signifying a light in its on and off state respectively. Each entry is an element of Z_{2}, the field of integers modulo 2. Anderson and Feil found that in order for a configuration to be solvable (deriving the null vector from the original configuration) it must be orthogonal to the two vectors N_{1} and N_{2} below (pictured as a 5×5 array but not to be confused with matrices).

$$N_1 = \begin{pmatrix} 0 & 1 & 1 & 1 & 0 \\ 1 & 0 & 1 & 0 & 1 \\ 1 & 1 & 0 & 1 & 1 \\ 1 & 0 & 1 & 0 & 1 \\ 0 & 1 & 1 & 1 & 0 \end{pmatrix}, N_2 = \begin{pmatrix} 1 & 0 & 1 & 0 & 1 \\ 1 & 0 & 1 & 0 & 1 \\ 0 & 0 & 0 & 0 & 0 \\ 1 & 0 & 1 & 0 & 1 \\ 1 & 0 & 1 & 0 & 1 \end{pmatrix}$$

In addition, they found that N_{1} and N_{2} can be used to find three additional solutions from a solution, and that these four solutions are the only four solutions (excluding redundant moves) to the starting given configuration. These four solutions are X, X + N_{1}, X + N_{2}, and X + N_{1} + N_{2} where X is a solution to the starting given configuration. An introduction into this method was published by Robert Eisele. This method generalizes to N×N grids and beyond.

=== Light chasing ===
"Light chasing" is a method similar to Gaussian elimination which always solves the puzzle (if a solution exists), although with the possibility of many redundant steps. In this approach, rows are manipulated one at a time starting with the top row. All the lights are disabled in the row by toggling the adjacent lights in the row directly below. The same method is then used on the consecutive rows up to the last one. The last row is solved separately, depending on its active lights. Corresponding lights (see table below) in the top row are toggled and the initial algorithm is run again, resulting in a solution.

Bottom row is	Toggle on top row
□□□■■	■□■■■
□□■□□	■■□■■
□■□□■	■■■■□
□■■■□	□□■■■
■□□■□	□■■■■
■□■□■	□■■□■
■■□□□	■■■□■

□ - An activated lamp.

■ - A deactivated lamp.

Tables and strategies for other board sizes are generated by playing Lights Out with a blank board and observing the result of bringing a particular light from the top row down to the bottom row.

=== Further results ===
Once a single solution is found, a solution with the minimum number of moves can be determined through elimination of redundant sets of button presses that have no cumulative effect. Existence of solutions has been proved for a wide variety of board configurations, such as hexagonal, while solutions to n-by-n boards for n≤200 have been explicitly constructed. There exists a solution for every N×N case. It is solvable on any undirected graph, where clicking on one vertex flips its value and its neighbours. More generally if the action matrix is symmetric then its diagonal is always solvable. Many further results are known.

== See also ==
- Berlekamp switching game
- Group theory
- Peg solitaire
