= Cantor's theorem (disambiguation) =

Cantor's theorem is a fundamental result in mathematical set theory.

Cantor's theorem may also refer to:

== Set theory ==
- Cantor–Bernstein theorem: cardinality of the class of countable order types equals the cardinality of the continuum
- Cantor–Bernstein–Schröder theorem: injections from A to B and from B to A imply a bijection between A and B

== Order theory and model theory ==
- Cantor's isomorphism theorem: every two countable dense unbounded linear orders are isomorphic

== Topology ==
- Cantor's intersection theorem: a decreasing nested sequence of non-empty compact sets has a non-empty intersection
- Heine–Cantor theorem: a continuous function on a compact space is uniformly continuous
- Cantor–Bendixson theorem: a closed set of a Polish space may be written uniquely as a disjoint union of a perfect set and a countable set

== See also ==
- Georg Cantor
- Cantor's diagonal argument
