= David G. Cantor =

American mathematician (1935–2012)

- Born: April 12, 1935
- Died: November 19, 2012 (aged 77)
- Education: University of California, Los Angeles
- Known for: Cantor–Zassenhaus algorithm

David Geoffrey Cantor (April 12, 1935 – November 19, 2012) was an American mathematician, specializing in number theory and combinatorics. The Cantor–Zassenhaus algorithm for factoring polynomials is named after him; he and Hans Zassenhaus published it in 1981.

== Biography ==
Cantor was born on April 12, 1935. He completed his undergraduate studies at the California Institute of Technology, graduating in 1956, and earned his doctorate from the University of California, Los Angeles (UCLA) in 1960, where he was supervised by Basil Gordon and Ernst G. Straus. He became an assistant professor at the University of Washington in 1962, moved back to UCLA in 1964, and retired in 1991. After his retirement, he worked at the Center for Communications Research in La Jolla, California.

Cantor specialized in number theory and combinatorics. The Cantor–Zassenhaus algorithm for factoring polynomials is named after him; he and Hans Zassenhaus published it in 1981. He received the National Science Foundation Postdoctoral Fellowship in 1960 and a Sloan Foundation Fellowship in 1968. In 2012, he became one of the inaugural fellows of the American Mathematical Society. At the time of his death, he had been a member of the American Mathematical Society for 54 years.

Cantor lived in San Diego, California. He died on November 19, 2012, at the age of 77.

== See also ==
- Cantor's algorithm
