= Swinnerton-Dyer polynomial =

Family of polynomials

In algebra, the Swinnerton-Dyer polynomials are a family of polynomials, introduced by Peter Swinnerton-Dyer, that serve as examples where polynomial factorization algorithms have worst-case runtime. They have the property of being reducible modulo every prime, while being irreducible over the rational numbers. They are a standard counterexample in number theory.

Given a finite set $P$ of prime numbers, the Swinnerton-Dyer polynomial associated to $P$ is the polynomial: $f_P(x) = \prod \left(x + \sum_{p\in P} (\pm) \sqrt{p}\right)$ where the product extends over all $2^{|P|}$ choices of sign in the enclosed sum. The polynomial $f_P(x)$ has degree $2^{|P|}$ and integer coefficients, which alternate in sign. If $|P|>1$, then $f_P(x)$ is reducible modulo $p$ for all primes $p$, into linear and quadratic factors, but irreducible over $\mathbb Q$. The Galois group of $f_P(x)$ is $\mathbb Z_2^{|P|}$.

The first few Swinnerton-Dyer polynomials are: $f_{\{2\}}(x) = x^2-2 = (x-\sqrt 2)(x+\sqrt 2)$ $f_{\{2,3\}}(x) = x^4-10x^2+1 = (x-\sqrt 2-\sqrt 3)(x-\sqrt 2+\sqrt 3)(x+\sqrt 2 -\sqrt 3)(x+\sqrt 2+\sqrt 3)$ $f_{\{2,3,5\}}(x) = x^8-40x^6+352x^4-960x^2+576.$
