= Outline of arithmetic =

The following outline is provided as an overview of and topical guide to arithmetic:

Arithmetic is an elementary branch of mathematics that deals with numerical operations like addition, subtraction, multiplication, and division. In a wider sense, it also includes exponentiation, extraction of roots, and taking logarithms, and the use of such operations to perform more complicated calculations.

Arithmetic is fundamental for both pure mathematics and its practical application to science and daily life. In pure mathematics, arithmetic is defined formally for various types of numbers, such as integers, fractions of integers (rational numbers), and real numbers. In practical application, arithmetic is usually approximate, operating on decimal or binary numbers, with rounding.

== Essence of arithmetic ==
- Elementary arithmetic
- Decimal arithmetic
- Decimal point
- Numeral
- Place value

== Arithmetic operations and related concepts ==
- Order of operations
- Addition
  - Summation – Answer after adding a sequence of numbers
  - Additive inverse
- Subtraction – Taking away numbers
- Multiplication – Repeated addition
  - Multiple – Product of multiplication
    - Least common multiple
  - Multiplicative inverse
- Division – Repeated subtraction
  - Modulo – The remainder of division
  - Quotient – Result of division
  - Quotition and partition – How many parts are there, and what is the size of each part
  - Fraction – A number that is not whole, often shown as a division equation
    - Decimal fraction – Representation of a fraction in the form of a number
    - Proper fraction – Fraction with a numerator that is less than the denominator
    - Improper fraction – Fractions with a numerator that is any number
    - Ratio – Showing how much one number can go into another
    - Least common denominator – Least common multiple of two or more fractions' denominators
  - Factoring – Breaking a number down into its products
    - Fundamental theorem of arithmetic
    - Prime number – Number divisible by only 1 or itself
      - Prime number theorem
      - Distribution of primes
    - Composite number – Number made of two smaller integers
    - Factor – A number that can be divided from its original number to get a whole number
      - Greatest common factor – Greatest factor that is common between two numbers
      - Euclid's algorithm for finding greatest common divisors
- Exponentiation (power) – Repeated multiplication
  - Square root – Reversal of a power of 2 (exponent of 1/2)
  - Cube root – Reversal of a power of 3 (exponent of 1/3)
- Properties of Operations
  - Associative property
  - Distributive property
  - Commutative property
- Factorial – Multiplication of numbers from the current number to 0

== Types of numbers ==
- Real number
  - Rational number
    - Integer
      - Natural number
    - Composite number
  - Irrational number
- Odd number
- Even number
- Positive number
- Negative number
- Prime number
  - List of prime numbers
- Highly composite number
- Perfect number
- Algebraic number
- Transcendental number
- Hypercomplex number
- Transfinite number
- Indefinite and fictitious numbers

== Elementary statistics ==
- Mean
  - Weighted mean
- Median
- Mode
- Range

== Other basic concepts ==
- Combinations
- Percentage
- Permutations
- Proportion
- Rounding
- Scientific notation

== Modern arithmetic ==
- Computer-Based Math
- Outline of number theory
- Riemann zeta function
- L-functions
- Multiplicative functions
- Modular forms

== See also ==
- Elementary mathematics
- Mathematical software and Computer-Based Math
- Table of mathematical symbols
