= Short division =

Way to break a division problem into smaller steps

In arithmetic, short division is a division algorithm which breaks down a division problem into a series of easier steps. It is an abbreviated form of long division — whereby the products are omitted and the partial remainders are notated as superscripts.

As a result, a short division tableau is shorter than its long division counterpart — though sometimes at the expense of relying on mental arithmetic, which could limit the size of the divisor.

For most people, small integer divisors up to 12 are handled using memorised multiplication tables, although the procedure could also be adapted to the larger divisors as well.

As in all division problems, a number called the dividend is divided by another, called the divisor. The answer to the problem would be the quotient, and in the case of Euclidean division, the remainder would be included as well.

Using short division, arbitrarily large dividends can be handled.

== Tableau ==
Short division does not use the slash (/) or division sign (÷) symbols. Instead, it displays the dividend, divisor, and quotient (when it is found) in a tableau. An example is shown below, representing the division of 500 by 4. The quotient is 125.

$$\begin{array}{r}
125\\
4\overline{)500}\\
\end{array}$$

Alternatively, the bar may be placed below the number, which means the sum proceeds down the page. This is in distinction to long division, where the space under the dividend is required for workings:

$$\begin{array}{r}
4\underline{)500}\\
125\\
\end{array}$$

== Example ==
The procedure involves several steps. As an example, consider 950 divided by 4:

1. The dividend and divisor are written in the short division tableau:
  $$4 \overline{)950} \$$
  Dividing 950 by 4 in a single step would require knowing the multiplication table up to 238 × 4. Instead, the division is reduced to small steps. Starting from the left, enough digits are selected to form a number (called the partial dividend) that is at least 4×1 but smaller than 4×10 (4 being the divisor in this problem). Here, the partial dividend is 9.
2. The first number to be divided by the divisor (4) is the partial dividend (9). One writes the integer part of the result (2) above the division bar over the leftmost digit of the dividend, and one writes the remainder (1) as a small digit above and to the right of the partial dividend (9).
  $$\begin{matrix}
2\\
4\overline{)9^150}
\end{matrix}$$
3. Next one repeats step 2, using the small digit concatenated with the next digit of the dividend to form a new partial dividend (15). Dividing the new partial dividend by the divisor (4), one writes the result as before — the quotient above the next digit of the dividend, and the remainder as a small digit to the upper right. (Here 15 divided by 4 is 3, with a remainder of 3.)
  $$\begin{matrix}
\,\,2\ 3\\
4\overline{)9^15^30}\\
\end{matrix}$$
4. One continues repeating step 2 until there are no digits remaining in the dividend. In this example, we see that 30 divided by 4 is 7 with a remainder of 2. The number written above the bar (237) is the quotient, and the last small digit (2) is the remainder.
  $$\begin{matrix}
\quad 2\ 3\ 7\\
4\overline{)9^15^30^2}\\
\end{matrix}$$
5. The answer in this example is 237 with a remainder of 2. Alternatively, we can continue the above procedure if we want to produce a decimal answer. We do this by adding a decimal point and zeroes as necessary at the right of the dividend, and then treating each zero as another digit of the dividend. Thus, the next step in such a calculation would give the following:
  $$\begin{matrix}
\quad 2\ 3\ 7.\ 5\\
4\overline{)9^15^30.^20}\\
\end{matrix}$$

Using the alternative layout the final workings would be:

$$\begin{array}{r}
4\underline{)9^{1}5^{3}0.^{2}0}\\
2^{\color{White}1}3^{\color{White}3}7.^{\color{White}2}5\\
\end{array}$$

As usual, similar steps can also be used to handle the cases with a decimal dividend, or the cases where the divisor involves multiple digits.

== Prime factorization ==
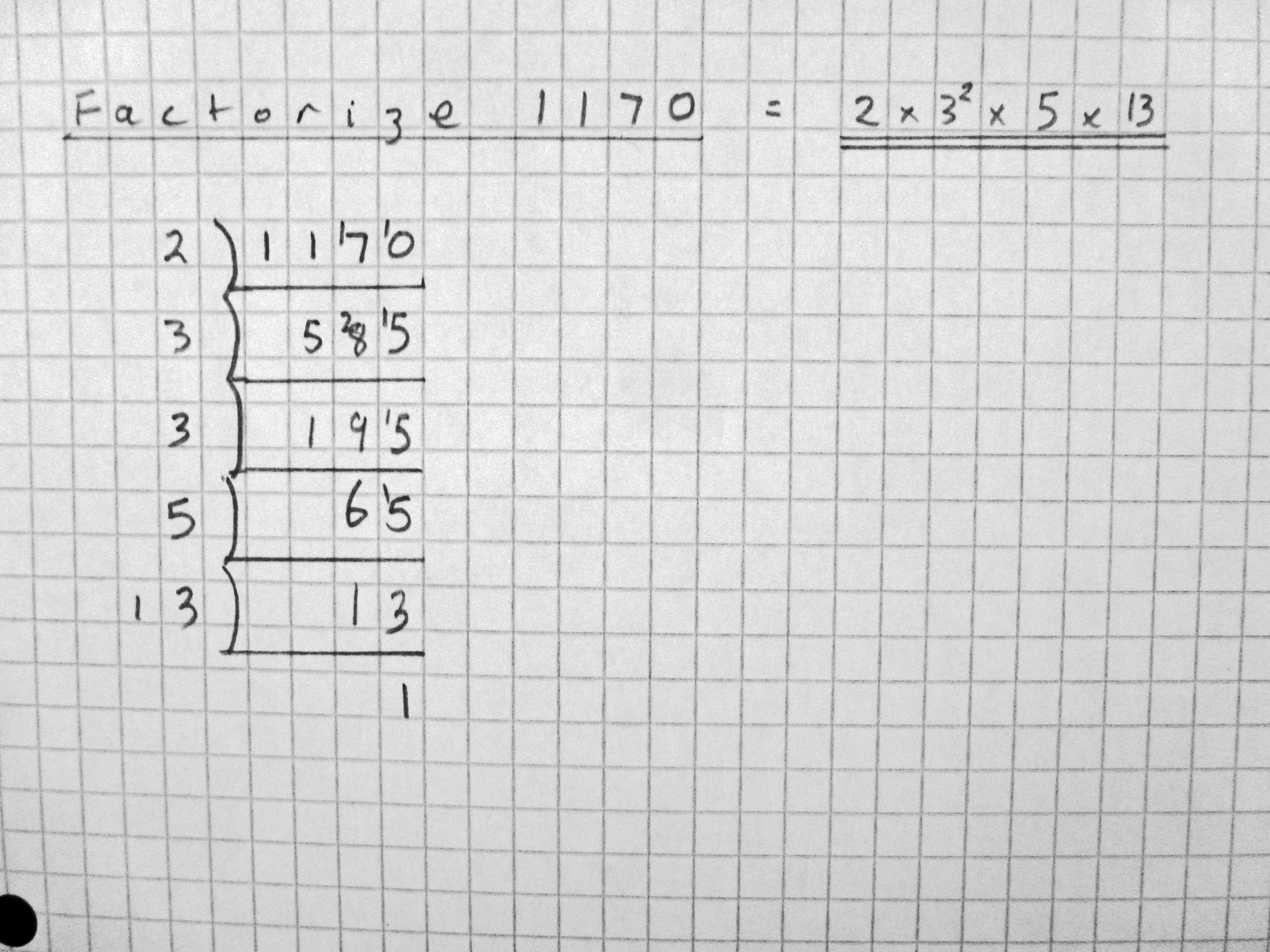
An example of manual factorizing.

A common requirement is to reduce a number to its prime factors. This is used particularly in working with vulgar fractions. The dividend is successively divided by prime numbers, repeating where possible:

$$\begin{array}{r}
2\underline{)950}\\
5\underline{)475}\\
5\underline{){\color{White}0}95}\\
\ \ \ 19\\
\end{array}$$

This results in the factorization $950 = 2 \times 5^2 \times 19$.

== Modulo division ==
When one is interested only in the remainder of the division, this procedure (a variation of short division) ignores the quotient and tallies only the remainders. It can be used for manual modulo calculation or as a test for even divisibility. The quotient digits are not written down.

The following shows the solution (using short division) of 16762109 divided by seven.

$$\begin{matrix}
7)16^27^66^32^41^60^49^0
\end{matrix}$$

The remainder is zero, so 16762109 is exactly divisible by 7.

=== As an automaton ===
Given a divisor k, this procedure can be written as a deterministic finite automaton with k states, each corresponding to a possible remainder. This implies that the set of numbers divisible by k is a regular language.

== See also ==
- Arbitrary-precision arithmetic
- Chunking (division)
- Division algorithm
- Elementary arithmetic
- Fourier division
- Long division
- Polynomial long division
- Synthetic division
