= Tableau =

Tableau (French for 'little table' literally, also used to mean 'picture'; pl.: tableaux or, rarely, tableaus) may refer to:

== Arts ==
- Tableau vivant, a motionless performance evoking a painting or sculpture; or a painting or photograph evoking such a theatrical scene
- Scene (drama), in opera, ballet, and some other dramatic forms
- Tableau (sculpture), a genre of large-scale life-size sculptural groups
- Tableau, a 2022 drama film.
- Tableau, a series of four paintings by Piet Mondrian titled Tableau I through to Tableau IV

== Games ==
- Tableau (card game), a specific patience card game
- Tableau (cards), the layout in patience and fishing card games
- Tableau (dominoes), the layout in dominoes

== Other ==
- Tableau, another term for a table of data, particularly:
  - Cryptographic tableau, or tabula recta, used in manual cipher systems
  - Division tableau, a table used to do long division
- Method of analytic tableaux (also semantic tableau or truth tree), a technique of automated theorem proving in logic
- Tableau Software, a company providing tools for data visualization and business intelligence
- Young tableau, a combinatorial object built on partition diagrams
- Simplex tableau, a structured matrix used in the simplex algorithm

== See also ==
- Table (disambiguation)
- Tableau économique or Economic Table, an economic model first described by French economist François Quesnay in 1758
