= Casio AL-10 =

Pocket calculator

Casio AL-10 is an arithmetic pocket calculator released by Casio in 1963.

== History ==
Casio AL-10 was released in 1976 together with Casio AL-8. An uptate called AL-10S was released in the same year.

== Functionality ==
Casio AL-10, together with AL-8, was the first calculator to accept and display fractions. It was capable of displaying 10 numbers and had a six-mode program capable of switching between square root function, simultaneous addition of two columns of figures, the ability in divisions to give the integer number and the remainder, fraction mode, sexagesimal calculations, and standard deviation.

== Design ==
Casio AL-10 measures 80mm x 140mm x 25mm and weights 134g. The case is white with black details. There are 24 keys. Numbers are displayed with vacuum fluorescent display. It uses two AA batteries, consumming 0.2W. Calculations were made with a NEC D573C chip.
