= Elementary arithmetic =

Numbers and the basic operations on them

The symbols for elementary-level math operations. From top-left going clockwise: addition, division, multiplication, and subtraction.

Elementary arithmetic is a branch of mathematics involving addition, subtraction, multiplication, and division. Due to its low level of abstraction, broad range of application, and position as the foundation of all mathematics, elementary arithmetic is generally the first branch of mathematics taught in schools.

== Numeral systems ==
In numeral systems, digits are characters used to represent the value of numbers. An example of a numeral system is the predominantly used Indo-Arabic numeral system (0 to 9), which uses a decimal positional notation. Other numeral systems include the Kaktovik system (often used in the Eskimo-Aleut languages of Alaska, Canada, and Greenland), and is a vigesimal positional notation system. Regardless of the numeral system used, the results of arithmetic operations are unaffected.

== Successor function and ordering ==
In elementary arithmetic, the successor of a natural number (including zero) is the next natural number and is the result of adding one to that number. The predecessor of a natural number (excluding zero) is the previous natural number and is the result of subtracting one from that number. For example, the successor of zero is one, and the predecessor of eleven is ten ($0+1=1$ and $11-1=10$). Every natural number has a successor, and every natural number except 0 has a predecessor.

The natural numbers have a total ordering. If one number is greater than ($>$) another number, then the latter is less than ($<$) the former. For example, three is less than eight ($3<8$), thus eight is greater than three ($8>3$). The natural numbers are also well-ordered, meaning that any subset of the natural numbers has a least element.

== Counting ==
Counting assigns a natural number to each object in a set, starting with 1 for the first object and increasing by 1 for each subsequent object. The number of objects in the set is the count. This is also known as the cardinality of the set.

Counting can also be the process of tallying, the process of drawing a mark for each object in a set.

== Addition ==
Example of addition with carry. The black numbers are the addends, the green number is the carry, and the blue number is the sum. In the rightmost digit, the addition of 9 and 7 is 16, carrying 1 into the next pair of the digit to the left, making its addition 1 + 5 + 2 = 8. Therefore, 59 + 27 = 86.

Addition is a mathematical operation that combines two or more numbers (called addends or summands) to produce a combined number (called the sum). The addition of two numbers is expressed with the plus sign ($+$). It is performed according to these rules:

- The order in which the addends are added does not affect the sum. This is known as the commutative property of addition. (a + b) and (b + a) produce the same output.
- The sum of two numbers is unique; there is only one correct answer for a sums.

When the sum of a pair of digits results in a two-digit number, the "tens" digit is referred to as the "carry digit". In elementary arithmetic, students typically learn to add whole numbers and may also learn about topics such as negative numbers and fractions.

== Subtraction ==
Subtraction evaluates the difference between two numbers, where the minuend is the number being subtracted from, and the subtrahend is the number being subtracted. It is represented using the minus sign ($-$). The minus sign is also used to notate negative numbers.

Subtraction is not commutative, which means that the order of the numbers can change the final value; $3-5$ is not the same as $5-3$. In elementary arithmetic, the minuend is always larger than the subtrahend to produce a positive result.

Subtraction is also used to separate, combine (e.g., find the size of a subset of a specific set), and find quantities in other contexts.

There are several methods to accomplish subtraction. The traditional mathematics method subtracts using methods suitable for hand calculation. Reform mathematics is distinguished generally by the lack of preference for any specific technique, replaced by guiding students to invent their own methods of computation.

American schools teach a method of subtraction using borrowing. A subtraction problem such as $86-39$ is solved by borrowing a 10 from the tens place to add to the ones place in order to facilitate the subtraction. Subtracting 9 from 6 involves borrowing a 10 from the tens place, making the problem into $70+16-39$. This is indicated by crossing out the 8, writing a 7 above it, and writing a 1 above the 6. These markings are called "crutches", which were invented by William A. Brownell, who used them in a study, in November 1937.

The Austrian method, also known as the additions method, is taught in certain European countries. In contrast to the previous method, no borrowing is used, although there are crutches that vary according to certain countries. The method of addition involves augmenting the subtrahend. This transforms the previous problem into $(80+16)-(39+10)$. A small 1 is marked below the subtrahend digit as a reminder.

=== Example ===
Subtracting the numbers 792 and 308, starting with the ones column, 2 is smaller than 8. Using the borrowing method, 10 is borrowed from 90, reducing 90 to 80. This changes the problem to $12-8$.

	Hundreds	Tens	Ones
		8	^{1}2
	7	~~9~~	~~2~~
−	3	0	8
			4

In the tens column, the difference between 80 and 0 is 80.

	Hundreds	Tens	Ones
		8	^{1}2
	7	~~9~~	~~2~~
−	3	0	8
		8	4

In the hundreds column, the difference between 700 and 300 is 400.

	Hundreds	Tens	Ones
		8	^{1}2
	7	~~9~~	~~2~~
−	3	0	8
	4	8	4

The result:

$$792 - 308 = 484$$

== Multiplication ==
Multiplication is a mathematical operation of repeated addition. When two numbers are multiplied, the resulting value is a product. The numbers being multiplied are multiplicands, multipliers, or factors. Multiplication can be expressed as "five times three equals fifteen," "five times three is fifteen," or "fifteen is the product of five and three."

Multiplication is represented using the multiplication sign (×), the asterisk (*), parentheses (), or a dot (⋅). The statement "five times three equals fifteen" can be written as "$5 \times 3 = 15$", "$5 \ast 3 = 15$", "$(5)(3) = 15$", or "$5 \cdot 3 = 15$".

In elementary arithmetic, multiplication satisfies the following properties (Note: While elementary arithmetic mainly operates under the set of natural numbers (sometimes including 0), multiplication under other number sets can satisfy more or less properties than those listed here, such as having an inverse element in the rational numbers and beyond, or lacking commutativity in the quaternions and higher order number sets.):

- Commutativity. Switching the order in a product does not change the result: $a \times b = b \times a$.
- Associativity. Rearranging the order of parentheses in a product does not change the result: $a \times (b \times c) = (a \times b) \times c$.
- Distributivity. Multiplication distributes over addition: $a \times (b + c) = a \times b + a \times c$.
- Identity. Any number multiplied by 1 is itself: $a \times 1 = a$.
- Zero. Any number multiplied by 0 is 0: $a \times 0 = 0$.

In the multiplication algorithm, the "tens" digit of the product of a pair of digits is referred to as the "carry digit".

=== Example of multiplication for a single-digit factor ===
Multiplying 729 and 3, starting on the ones column, the product of 9 and 3 is 27. 7 is written under the ones column and 2 is written above the tens column as a carry digit.

	Hundreds	Tens	Ones
		2
	7	2	9
×			3
			7

The product of 2 and 3 is 6, and the carry digit adds 2 to 6, so 8 is written under the tens column.

	Hundreds	Tens	Ones
		2
	7	2	9
×			3
		8	7

The product of 7 and 3 is 21, and since this is the last digit, 2 will not be written as a carry digit, but instead beside 1.

	Hundreds	Tens	Ones
		2
	7	2	9
×			3
2	1	8	7

The result:

$$3 \times 729 = 2187$$

=== Example of multiplication for multiple-digit factors ===
Multiplying 789 and 345, starting with the ones column, the product of 789 and 5 is 3945.

	7	8	9
×	3	4	5
3	9	4	5

4 is in the tens digit. The multiplier is 40, not 4. The product of 789 and 40 is 31560.

		7	8	9
	×	3	4	5
	3	9	4	5
3	1	5	6	0

3 is in the hundreds digits. The multiplier is 300. The product of 789 and 300 is 236700.

			7	8	9
		×	3	4	5
		3	9	4	5
	3	1	5	6	0
2	3	6	7	0	0

Adding all the products,

				7	8	9
×				3	4	5
			3	9	4	5
		3	1	5	6	0
+	2	3	6	7	0	0
	2	7	2	2	0	5

The result:

$$789 \times 345 = 272205$$

== Division ==
Division is an arithmetic operation, and the inverse of multiplication, given that $c \times b = a$.

Division can be written as $a \div b$, $\frac ab$, or a/b. This can be read verbally as "a divided by b" or "a over b".

In some non-English-speaking cultures, "a divided by b" is written a : b. In English usage, the colon is restricted to the concept of ratios ("a is to b").

In an equation $a \div b = c$, a is the dividend, b the divisor, and c the quotient. Division by zero is considered impossible at an elementary arithmetic level.

Two numbers can be divided on paper using long division. An abbreviated version of long division, short division, can be used for smaller divisors.

A less systematic method involves the concept of chunking, involving subtracting more multiples from the partial remainder at each stage.

=== Example ===
Dividing 272 and 8, starting with the hundreds digit, 2 is not divisible by 8. Add 20 and 7 to get 27. The largest number that the divisor of 8 can be multiplied by without exceeding 27 is 3, so it is written under the tens column. Subtracting 24 (the product of 3 and 8) from 27 gives 3 as the remainder.

	2	7	2
÷			8
		3

Going to the ones digit, the number is 2. Adding 30 (the remainder, 3, times 10) and 2 gets 32. The quotient of 32 and 8 is 4, which is written under the ones column.

	2	7	2
÷			8
		3	4

The result:
$$272 \div 8 = 34$$

==== Bus stop method ====
Another method of dividing taught in some schools is the bus stop method, sometimes notated as

            result  
  (divisor) dividend

The steps here are shown below, using the same example as above:

     034      
   8|272
     0        ( 8 ×  0 =  0)
     27       ( 2 -  0 =  2)
     24       ( 8 ×  3 = 24)
      32      (27 - 24 =  3)
      32      ( 8 ×  4 = 32)
       0      (32 - 32 =  0)

The result:

$$272 \div 8 = 34$$

== Educational standards ==
Elementary arithmetic is typically taught at the primary or secondary school levels and is governed by local educational standards. There has been debate about the content and methods used to teach elementary arithmetic in the United States and Canada.

== See also ==
- Early numeracy
- Elementary mathematics
- Chunking (division)
- Plus and minus signs
- Peano axioms
- Division by zero
- Real number
- Imaginary number
- Number sentence
