= Chunking (division) =

Division method

In mathematics education at the primary school level, chunking (sometimes also called the partial quotients method) is an elementary approach for solving simple division questions by repeated subtraction. It is also known as the hangman method with the addition of a line separating the divisor, dividend, and partial quotients. It has a counterpart in the grid method for multiplication as well.

In general, chunking is more flexible than the traditional method in that the calculation of quotient is less dependent on the place values. As a result, it is often considered to be a more intuitive, but a less systematic approach to divisions – where the efficiency is highly dependent upon one's numeracy skills.

To calculate the whole number quotient of dividing a large number by a small number, the student repeatedly takes away "chunks" of the large number, where each "chunk" is an easy multiple (for example 100×, 10×, 5× 2×, etc.) of the small number, until the large number has been reduced to zero – or the remainder is less than the small number itself. At the same time the student is generating a list of the multiples of the small number (i.e., partial quotients) that have so far been taken away, which when added up together would then become the whole number quotient itself.

For example, to calculate 132 ÷ 8, one might successively subtract 80, 40 and 8 to leave 4:

      132
       80   (10 × 8)
       --
       52
       40   ( 5 × 8)
       --
       12
        8   ( 1 × 8) 
       --
        4
            --------  
      132 =  16 × 8 + 4

Because 10 + 5 + 1 = 16, 132 ÷ 8 is 16 with 4 remaining.

In the UK, this approach for elementary division sums has come into widespread classroom use in primary schools since the late 1990s, when the National Numeracy Strategy in its "numeracy hour" brought in a new emphasis on more free-form oral and mental strategies for calculations, rather than the rote learning of standard methods.

Compared to the short division and long division methods that are traditionally taught, chunking may seem strange, unsystematic, and arbitrary. However, it is argued that chunking, rather than moving straight to short division, gives a better introduction to division, in part because the focus is always holistic, focusing throughout on the whole calculation and its meaning, rather than just rules for generating successive digits. The more freeform nature of chunking also means that it requires more genuine understanding – rather than just the ability to follow a ritualised procedure – to be successful.

An alternative way of performing chunking involves the use of the standard long division tableau – except that the partial quotients are stacked up on the top of each other above the long division sign, and that all numbers are spelled out in full. By allowing one to subtract more chunks than what one currently has, it is also possible to expand chunking into a fully bidirectional method as well.
