= The Table =

The Table may refer to:

- The Table (British Columbia) in British Columbia, Canada
- The Table (1973 film), a 1973 short film, written by Adrian Lyne and Michael Hayes
- The Table (2016 film), a 2016 South Korean drama film
- The Table (EP), 2019 EP by NU'EST
- The Table (punk band), a punk rock band from Cardiff, Wales
- The Table (restaurant), a restaurant at Colaba, Mumbai, India

== See also ==
- Table (disambiguation)
