= Tableau (card game) =

Tableau is a solitaire card game played with two decks of playing cards.

It has a unique layout where all cards are open, and arranged to the left and right of the foundations, similar to Beleaguered Castle, Fortress, and other games in this family like Little Napoleon Patience, Kings Solitaire, or Fürst Bismarck. It is a game that requires thinking and planning, and typically begins very difficult, and gets easier as you progress.

== Rules ==
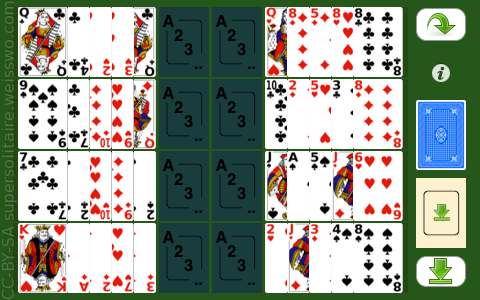
Tableau: Game Setup

Sequences are built down in suit, and can be moved within the tableau. The foundations are built up from the aces in suit.

== See also ==
- Beleaguered Castle
- List of solitaire games
- Glossary of solitaire terms
