= The Castle of Indolence (disambiguation) =

The Castle of Indolence is a poem by James Thomson.

The Castle of Indolence may also refer to:

- The Castle of Indolence (card game), a solitaire card game
- The Castle of Indolence: On Poetry, Poets, and Poetasters, a book by Thomas Disch
