= Tabler =

Tabler may refer to:

== People ==
- P. Dempsey Tabler (1876–1956), American singer, athlete, businessman, and actor
- Pat Tabler (born 1958), American baseball player and commentator
- Richard Lee Tabler (1979–2025), American executed spree killer
- William B. Tabler (1914–2004), American architect, and his son, William B. Tabler Jr.

== Other uses ==
- Tabler, Oklahoma, an unincorporated community in eastern Grady County, Oklahoma
- Tablers, an American soccer team active from 1927 to 1931

== See also ==
- Strode-Morrison-Tabler House and Farm, a historic home in West Virginia
- Table (disambiguation)
