= Table Rock =

Table Rock may refer to:

== Canada ==
- Table Rock, Niagara Falls, a former rock formation
  - Table Rock Welcome Centre, a retail center near the site of Table Rock, Niagara Falls

== United States ==
- Table Rock (Ada County, Idaho), a hill overlooking Boise, Idaho
- Table Rock, Missouri, a village in Taney County
  - Table Rock State Park (Missouri)
- Table Rock, Phelps County, Missouri, an unincorporated community
- Table Rock, Nebraska
- Table Rock (North Carolina), a mountain
- Table Rock, West Virginia
- Table Rock, Wyoming
- Table Rock Indian Reservation, a former Indian reservation in southwestern Oregon
- Table Rock Lake, an artificial lake in Missouri and Arkansas
- Table Rock State Park (South Carolina)
- Table Rock Wilderness in northwestern Oregon
- Upper and Lower Table Rock, volcanic plateaus in southwestern Oregon
