= Table =

Table may refer to:

- Table (database), how the table data arrangement is used within the databases
- Table (furniture), a piece of furniture with a flat surface and one or more legs
- Table (information), a data arrangement with rows and columns
- Table (landform), a flat area of land
- Table (parliamentary procedure)
- Table (sports), a ranking of the teams in a sports league
- Tables (board game)
- Mathematical table
- Tables of the skull, a term for the flat bones
- Table, surface of the sound board (music) of a string instrument
- Al-Ma'ida, the fifth surah of the Qur'an, occasionally translated as “The Table”
- Calligra Tables, a spreadsheet application
- Water table

== See also ==
- Spreadsheet, a computer application
- Table cut, a type of diamond cut
- The Table (disambiguation)
- Table Mountain (disambiguation)
- Table Rock (disambiguation)
- Tabler (disambiguation)
- Tablet (disambiguation)
