= Fourier division =

Fourier division or cross division is a pencil-and-paper method of division which helps to simplify the process when the divisor has more than two digits. It was invented by Joseph Fourier.

== Method ==
The following exposition assumes that the numbers are broken into two-digit pieces, separated by commas: e.g. 3456 becomes 34,56. In general x,y denotes x⋅100 + y and x,y,z denotes x⋅10000 + y⋅100 + z, etc.

Suppose that we wish to divide c by a, to obtain the result b. (So a × b = c.)

$$\frac{c}{a}=\frac{c_1,c_2,c_3,c_4,c_5\dots}{a_1,a_2,a_3,a_4,a_5\dots}=b_1,b_2,b_3,b_4,b_5\dots = b$$

Note that a_{1} may not have a leading zero; it should stand alone as a two-digit number.

We can find the successive terms b_{1}, b_{2}, etc., using the following formulae:

$$b_1=\frac{c_1,c_2}{a_1}\mbox{ with remainder }r_1$$

$$b_2=\frac{r_1,c_3 - b_1\times a_2}{a_1}\mbox{ with remainder }r_2$$

$$b_3=\frac{r_2,c_4 - b_2\times a_2 - b_1\times a_3}{a_1}\mbox{ with remainder }r_3$$

$$b_4=\frac{r_3,c_5 - b_3\times a_2 - b_2\times a_3 - b_1\times a_4}{a_1}\mbox{ with remainder }r_4 \dots$$

Each time we add a term to the numerator until it has as many terms as a. From then on, the number of terms remains constant, so there is no increase in difficulty. Once we have as much precision as we need, we use an estimate to place the decimal point.

It will often be the case that one of the b terms will be negative. For example, 93,−12 denotes 9288, while −16,32 denotes −1600 + 32 or −1568. (Note: 45,−16,32 denotes 448432.) Care must be taken with the signs of the remainders also.

The general term is

$$b_i=\frac{r_{i-1},c_{i+1} - \textstyle \sum_{j=2}^i b_{i-j+1}\times a_j}{a_1}\mbox{ with remainder }r_i$$

=== Partial quotients with more than two digits ===
In cases where one or more of the b terms has more than two digits, the final quotient value b cannot be constructed simply by concatenating the digit pairs. Instead, each term, starting with $b_1,$ should be multiplied by 100, and the next term added (or, if negative, subtracted). This result should be multiplied by 100, and the next term added or subtracted, etc., until all terms are exhausted. In other words, we construct partial sums of the b terms:

$$B_1 = b_1$$
$$B_i = 100b_{i-1} + b_i$$

The last partial sum is the value for b.

== Example ==
Find the reciprocal of π ≈ 3.14159.

$$\frac{1}{\pi}=\frac{10,00,00\dots}{31,41,59\dots}=b_1,b_2,b_3\dots = b$$

$$b_1=\frac{10,00}{31}=32\mbox{ with remainder }8$$

$$b_2=\frac{8,00 - 32\times 41}{31}=\frac{-512}{31}=-17\mbox{ with remainder }15$$

$$b_3=\frac{15,00 + 17\times 41 - 32\times 59}{31}=\frac{309}{31}=10\mbox{ with remainder }-1.$$

The result is 32,-17,10 or 31,83,10 yielding 0.318310.

== Bibliography ==
- Ronald W Doerfler. Dead Reckoning: Calculating without Instruments. Gulf Publishing, 1993.
