= Quotition and partition =

Operations in arithmetic

In arithmetic, quotition and partition are two ways of viewing fractions and division. In quotitive division one asks "how many parts are there?" while in partitive division one asks "what is the size of each part?"

In general, a quotient $Q = N / D,$ where Q, N, and D are integers or rational numbers, can be conceived of in either of 2 ways:

1. Quotition: "How many parts of size D must be added to get a sum of N?"
  $$N = Q \times D = \underbrace{D + D + \cdots + D}_{Q\text{ parts}}.$$
2. Partition: "What is the size of each of D equal parts whose sum is N?"
  $$N = D \times Q = \underbrace{Q + Q + \cdots + Q}_{D\text{ parts}}.$$

For example, the quotient $6 / 2 = 3$ can be conceived of as representing either of the decompositions:

$$6 = \underbrace{2+2+2}_{\text{3 parts}} = \underbrace{3+3}_{\text{2 parts}}.$$

In the rational number system used in elementary mathematics, the numerical answer is always the same regardless of interpretation, as a consequence of the commutativity of multiplication.

== Quotition ==
Thought of quotitively, a division problem can be solved by repeatedly subtracting groups of the size of the divisor. For instance, suppose each egg carton fits 12 eggs, and the problem is to find how many cartons are needed to fit 36 eggs in total. Groups of 12 eggs at a time can be separated from the main pile until none are left, 3 groups:

$$36 \text{ eggs} \; \underbrace{\!{} - 12 \text{ eggs} - 12 \text{ eggs} - 12 \text{ eggs}}_{3 \text{ groups}} = 0 \quad \text{ implies }\quad \frac{36}{12} = 3.$$

If the last group is a remainder smaller than the divisor, it can be thought of as forming an additional smaller group. For example, if 45 eggs are to be put into 12-egg cartons, then after the first 3 cartons have been filled there are 9 eggs remaining, which only partially fill the 4th carton. The answer to the question "How many cartons are needed to fit 45 eggs?" is 4 cartons, since $\frac{45}{12} = 3 + \frac{9}{12}$ rounds up to 4.

Quotition is the concept of division most used in measurement. For example, measuring the length of a table using a measuring tape involves comparing the table to the markings on the tape. This is conceptually equivalent to dividing the length of the table by a unit of length, the distance between markings.

== Partition ==
Thought of partitively, a division problem might be solved by sorting the initial quantity into a specific number of groups by adding items to each group in turn. For instance, a deck of 52 playing cards could be divided among 4 players by dealing the cards to into 4 piles one at a time, eventually yielding piles of 13 cards each.

If there is a remainder in solving a partition problem, the parts will end up with unequal sizes. For example, if 52 cards are dealt out to 5 players, then 3 of the players will receive 10 cards each, and 2 of the players will receive 11 cards each, since $\frac{52}{5} = 10 + \frac{2}{5}$.

== See also ==
- List of partition topics
