= Fortress (card game) =

- A Patience game
- Named variants: Chessboard
- Family: Castle
- Deck: Single 52-card

Fortress is a patience or solitaire card game which is played with a deck of playing cards, in which the entire deck is laid out. It is a member of the Castle family of solitaire games, but has two more tableau piles than Beleaguered Castle and the piles are shorter.

== Overview ==
First, ten overlapping rows of cards are formed, two containing six cards (one on the left and one at the right) and the rest having five cards (four at each side). A space is left in the middle for the aces, which when available, become the bases for the foundations. The foundations are each built up by suit up to kings.

At the tableau rows, the top card (i.e. the fully exposed one) of each row is available for play on the foundations or in the tableau. Tableau building is up or down by suit as the player pleases. However, one card can be moved at a time, and building is not round-the-corner, i.e. aces cannot be placed over kings and vice versa. Spaces can be filled with any available card.

The game is won when all cards are built onto the foundations. But like Beleaguered Castle and its cousin Streets and Alleys, winning is slim because of the distribution of high cards in the tableau.

== Rules ==
Game-play is described in the book Lady Cadogan's Illustrated Games of Solitaire of Patience as follows:

Deal out the entire pack horizontally in two groups, as in tableau, beginning at the left hand, and dealing straight across each group, leaving space in the centre for four aces. These, when they can be played, form the foundation cards, and are to descend in sequence to kings.

Two key rules apply throughout: I. Only the outside cards of each group are available, until by their removal the next ones are released, the principle being that no card can be used that has another outside it. Note: By "outside" is meant the cards on the right side of the right-hand group, and those on the left side of the left-hand group. II. The foundations must follow suit.

Should any aces appear on the outside of either group, play them, as also any other suitable cards for continuing the foundations (Rules I and II).

You next proceed to form marriages, both in ascending and in descending lines, with cards on the outside of both groups (Rule I). But this must be done with extreme care, so as not only to release the greatest number of suitable cards, but also, if possible, to open out one entire horizontal row of cards to form a lane. The success of the game entirely depends on these lanes. If, therefore, you succeed in opening out one, it is more prudent not to refill it until, by some fresh combination, others can be made.

When a lane is to be refilled, select any available card (Rule I), and place it at the inner end of the lane, and along it any others in sequence of the same suit, the last card being, of course, the available one. One great use of these lanes is to reverse any sequences that have been made by marriages in the ascending line.

Note: Supposing you have placed upon a deuce a sequence ending with eight; place the eight at the inner end of the lane, the other cards following in succession until the deuce becomes the outside card. When there are more cards in the lane than the original number, they can be placed partly over each other.

There is no re-deal.

== Variants ==
Chessboard is a variation of Fortress. It is played like Fortress except that in this game, the player can freely choose the starting rank of all the foundations. Furthermore, building can go round-the-corner, i.e. aces can be placed over kings and vice versa.

== See also ==
- Beleaguered Castle
- List of solitaires
- Glossary of solitaire
