= The Table (restaurant) =

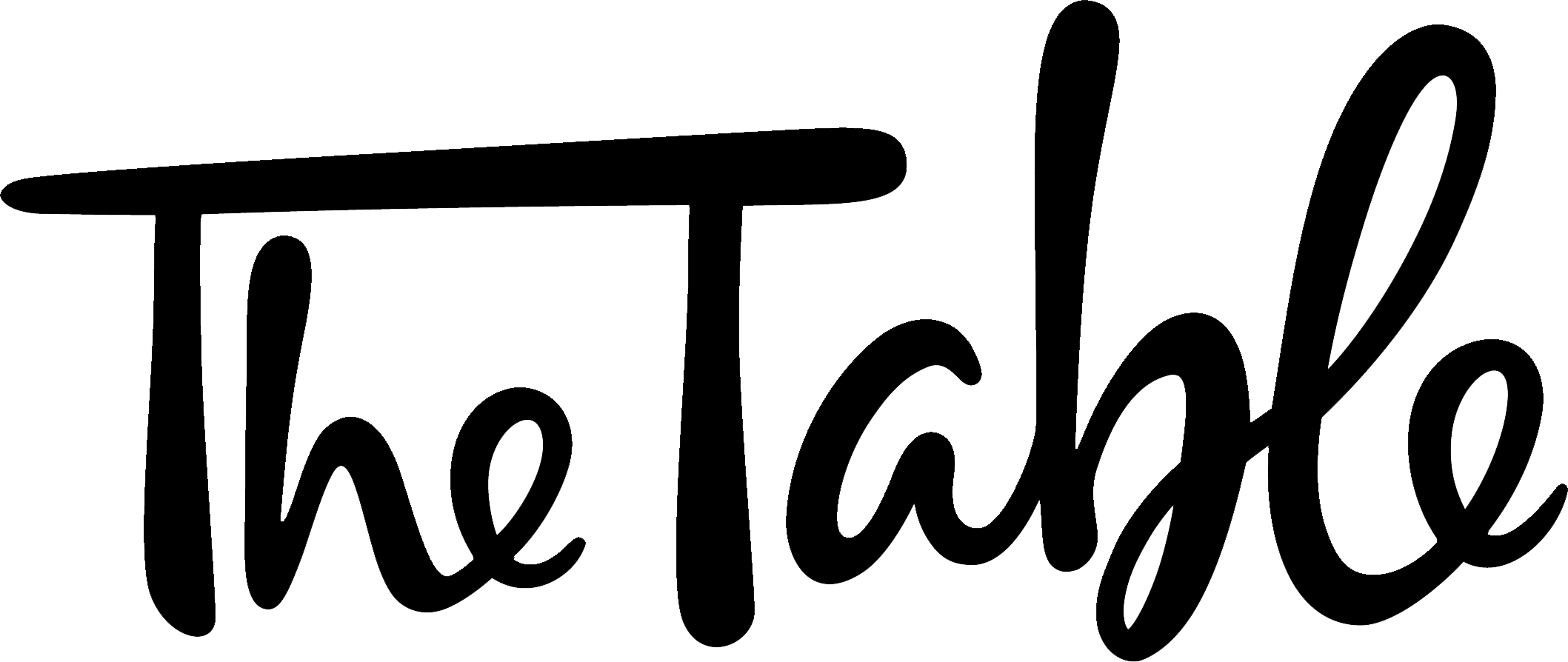
- Interactive map of The Table

Restaurant information
- Established: 2011
- Owners: Jay Yousuf and Gauri Devidayal
- Food type: European and Continental
- Location: Mumbai, Maharashtra, India
- Website: table.in

The Table is a restaurant at Colaba, Mumbai, India, known for serving San Francisco style globally inspired cuisine. It was established by Jay Yousuf and Gauri Devidayal in early 2011.

== History ==
The Table, was established by Jay Yousuf and Gauri Devidayal in early 2011, located around the corner from the famous Taj Hotel in Colaba. They teamed up with the San Francisco Bay area's consultant chef Joey Altman and executive chef Alex Sanchez. Chef Alex aims to procure ingredients from local sources, he does also use some imported products. In 2014, The Timeout Mumbai awarded The Table restaurant as the best restaurant in India.

== Cuisine and decor ==
The Table serves global cuisine which ranges from American, Japanese, Italian, French, Chinese and Thai. The Table's menu changes almost every day.

The trade mark of The Table is the 20-foot long Burma teak community dining table placed near the bar. The owners worked closely with architect Tarik Currimbhoy who helped design The Table.

== The Table Farm ==
The Table, with the assistance of Fresh & Local, a movement to facilitate urban farming in Mumbai, has started to grow fresh, high quality fruits, herbs and vegetables without chemicals, for the restaurant. The long-term goal of The Table Farm which is based in Alibag at the home of owners Jay Yousuf and Gauri Devidayal is to provide The Table with as much seasonal produce as possible, over about an acre of land. Currently The Table Farm grows spinach, beetroot, radish, carrots, mizune and other leafy greens, heirloom varieties of tomatoes, herbs and several different microgreens. The Table has recently opened their farm to the public with hands-on workshops where, along with Adrienne Thadani of Fresh & Local, participants discuss design of the farm, build permaculture beds, plant seeds and transplant seedlings, and end with a lunch made of freshly harvested crop from the restaurant.
