= Table Rock, West Virginia =

Table Rock
- Unincorporated community
- Location within the state of West Virginia Table Rock (the United States)
- Coordinates: 37°46′53″N 81°2′49″W
- Country: United States
- State: West Virginia
- County: Raleigh
- Elevation: 2,805 ft (855 m)
- Time zone: UTC-5 (Eastern (EST))
  - Summer (DST): UTC-4 (EDT)
- GNIS ID: 1547856

Table Rock was an unincorporated community in Raleigh County, West Virginia, United States. Its post office no longer exists.
