= Beleaguered Castle =

Card game

- A Patience game
- Origin: US
- Named variants: Castle of Indolence, Citadel, Streets and Alleys, Fortress
- Type: Open packer
- Family: Castle
- Deck: Single 52-card
- Playing time: 15 min
- Odds of winning: 68% with perfect play

Beleaguered Castle is a patience or solitaire card game played with a deck of 52 playing cards. It is sometimes described as "Freecell without cells" because its game play is somewhat akin to the popular solitaire computer game of that name but without extra empty spaces to maneuver. Beleaguered Castle is also called Laying Siege and Sham Battle.

== History ==
Beleaguered Castle is first recorded by Dick in 1883 and has been a regular feature in games compendia since then.

== Rules ==
First, the player removes the aces from the deck and aligns them vertically without overlapping them to form the foundations. Then cards are dealt to the left and right of the aces, forming eight rows of six overlapping cards each, in a distinctive tableau layout with wings on either side of the foundations.

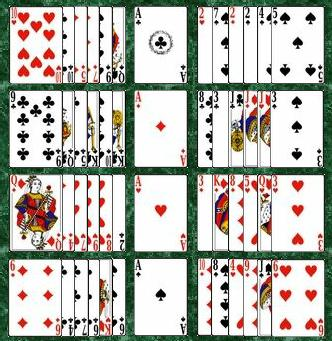
The initial layout in Beleaguered Castle

The top card of each row (the exposed card) is available for play either on the foundations or on any other row. The foundations are built up to kings by suit. Cards in the rows are built down in sequence regardless of suit. Once a row becomes empty, it can be filled by any card.

The game is won when all of the cards are built onto the foundations.

== Variants ==
The following are cited as variants by Parlett:

- Citadel, in which any card can be dealt onto the foundations during dealing. The other cards that aren't built are played as in Beleaguered Castle.
- Fortress (or Fort) and the closely related Chessboard (or Fives) both have five rows on each side of the foundations and allow building of sequences up and down in the same suit.
- Streets and Alleys, where the aces are included in the shuffling, resulting in the rows at the left of the foundations having seven cards each.

== Related game ==
Castle of Indolence is another game recorded only by Dick (1883, 85) which has some similarities to Beleaguered Castle. It is played with two decks (and hence eight foundations). Cards can be moved to the foundations regardless of suit. The top cards of four reserve piles (initially holding 13 cards) are available for moving on the foundations or rows.

== Pop culture ==
In the 2011 film Source Code, a card sequence from Beleaguered Castle forms the call sign for the Source Code program.

== See also ==
- Fortress
- List of patiences and solitaires
- Glossary of patience and solitaire terms

== Bibliography ==
- Dick, William Brisbane (1883). Dick's Games of Patience, Or, Solitaire with Cards. 44 games. NY: Dick & Fitzgerald.
- Parlett, David (1979). The Penguin Book of Patience, London: Penguin. ISBN 0-7139-1193-X
