= Quotient =

Mathematical result of division

The quotient of 12 apples by 3 apples is 4.

In arithmetic, a quotient (from Latin: quotiens 'how many times', pronounced /ˈkwoʊʃənt/) is a quantity produced by the division of two numbers. The quotient has widespread use throughout mathematics. It has two definitions: either the integer part of a division (in the case of Euclidean division) or a fraction or ratio (in the case of a general division). For example, when dividing 20 (the dividend) by 3 (the divisor), the quotient is 6 (with a remainder of 2) in the first sense and $6+\tfrac{2}{3}=6.66...$ (a repeating decimal) in the second sense.

== Unit of measurement ==
In metrology (International System of Quantities and the International System of Units), "quotient" refers to the general case with respect to the units of measurement of physical quantities. Ratios is the special case for dimensionless quotients of two quantities of the same kind. Quotients with a non-trivial dimension and compound units, especially when the divisor is a duration (e.g., "per second"), are known as rates. For example, density (mass divided by volume, in units of kg/m^{3}) is said to be a "quotient", whereas mass fraction (mass divided by mass, in kg/kg or in percent) is a "ratio". Specific quantities are intensive quantities resulting from the quotient of a physical quantity by mass, volume, or other measures of the system "size".

== Notation ==
The quotient is most frequently encountered as two numbers, or two variables, divided by a horizontal line. The words "dividend" and "divisor" refer to each individual part, while the word "quotient" refers to the whole.

$$\dfrac{1}{2} \quad
\begin{align}
& \leftarrow \text{dividend  or  numerator} \\
& \leftarrow \text{divisor  or  denominator}
\end{align}
\Biggr \} \leftarrow \text{quotient}$$

== Integer part definition ==
The quotient is also less commonly defined as the greatest whole number of times a divisor may be subtracted from a dividend—before making the remainder negative. For example, the divisor 3 may be subtracted up to 6 times from the dividend 20, before the remainder becomes negative:

20 − 3 − 3 − 3 − 3 − 3 − 3 ≥ 0,

while

20 − 3 − 3 − 3 − 3 − 3 − 3 − 3 < 0.

In this sense, a quotient is the integer part of the ratio of two numbers.

== Quotient of two integers ==
A rational number can be defined as the quotient of two integers (as long as the denominator is non-zero).

A more detailed definition goes as follows:

A real number r is rational, if and only if it can be expressed as a quotient of two integers with a nonzero denominator. A real number that is not rational is irrational.

Or more formally:

Given a real number r, r is rational if and only if there exists integers a and b such that $r = \tfrac a b$ and $b \neq 0$.

The existence of irrational numbers—numbers that are not a quotient of two integers—was first discovered in geometry, in such things as the ratio of the diagonal to the side in a square.

== More general quotients ==
Outside of arithmetic, many branches of mathematics have borrowed the word "quotient" to describe structures built by breaking larger structures into pieces. Given a set with an equivalence relation defined on it, a "quotient set" may be created which contains those equivalence classes as elements. A quotient group may be formed by breaking a group into a number of similar cosets, while a quotient space may be formed in a similar process by breaking a vector space into a number of similar linear subspaces.

== See also ==
- Product (mathematics)
- Quotient category
- Quotient graph
- Integer division
- Quotient module
- Quotient object
- Quotient of a formal language, also left and right quotient
- Quotient ring
- Quotient group
- Quotient set
- Quotient space (topology)
- Quotient type
- Quotition and partition
