= List of polynomial topics =

This is a list of polynomial topics, by Wikipedia page. See also trigonometric polynomial, list of algebraic geometry topics.

== Terminology ==
- Degree: The maximum exponents among the monomials.
- Factor: An expression being multiplied.
- Linear factor: A factor of degree one.
- Coefficient: An expression multiplying one of the monomials of the polynomial.
- Root (or zero) of a polynomial: Given a polynomial p(x), the x values that satisfy p(x) = 0 are called roots (or zeroes) of the polynomial p.
- Graphing
  - End behaviour –
  - Concavity –
  - Orientation –
  - Tangency point –
  - Inflection point – Point where concavity changes.

== Basics ==
- Polynomial
- Coefficient
- Monomial
- Polynomial long division
- Synthetic division
- Polynomial factorization
- Rational function
- Partial fraction
  - Partial fraction decomposition over R
- Vieta's formulas
- Integer-valued polynomial
- Algebraic equation
- Factor theorem
- Polynomial remainder theorem

=== Elementary abstract algebra ===
- Polynomial ring
- Greatest common divisior of two polynomials
- Symmetric function
- Homogeneous polynomial
- Polynomial SOS (sum of squares)

== Theory of equations ==
- Polynomial family
  - Quadratic function
  - Cubic function
  - Quartic function
  - Quintic function
  - Sextic function
  - Septic function
  - Octic function
- Completing the square
- Abel–Ruffini theorem
- Bring radical
- Binomial theorem
- Blossom (functional)
- Root of a function
- nth root (radical)
  - Surd
  - Square root
  - Methods of computing square roots
  - Cube root
  - Root of unity
  - Constructible number
  - Complex conjugate root theorem
- Algebraic element
- Horner scheme
- Rational root theorem
- Gauss's lemma (polynomial)
- Irreducible polynomial
  - Eisenstein's criterion
  - Primitive polynomial
- Fundamental theorem of algebra
- Hurwitz polynomial
- Polynomial transformation
- Tschirnhaus transformation
- Galois theory
- Discriminant of a polynomial
  - Resultant
- Elimination theory
  - Gröbner basis
  - Regular chain
  - Triangular decomposition
- Sturm's theorem
- Descartes's rule of signs
- Carlitz–Wan conjecture
- Polynomial decomposition, factorization under functional composition

== Calculus with polynomials ==
- Delta operator
- Bernstein–Sato polynomial

== Polynomial interpolation ==
- Lagrange polynomial
- Runge's phenomenon
- Spline (mathematics)

== Weierstrass approximation theorem ==
- Bernstein polynomial

== Linear algebra ==
- Characteristic polynomial
- Minimal polynomial
- Invariant polynomial

== Named polynomials and polynomial sequences ==
- Abel polynomials
- Actuarial polynomials
- Additive polynomials
- All one polynomials
- Appell sequence
- Askey–Wilson polynomials
- Bell polynomials
- Bernoulli polynomials
- Bernstein polynomial
- Bessel polynomials
- Binomial type
- Brahmagupta polynomials
- Caloric polynomial
- Charlier polynomials
- Chebyshev polynomials
- Chihara–Ismail polynomials
- Cyclotomic polynomials
- Dickson polynomial
- Ehrhart polynomial
- Exponential polynomials
- Favard's theorem
- Fibonacci polynomials
- Gegenbauer polynomials
- Gottlieb polynomials
- Hahn polynomials
- Hall–Littlewood polynomials
- Heat polynomial — see caloric polynomial
- Heckman–Opdam polynomials
- Hermite polynomials
- Hurwitz polynomial
- Jack function
- Jacobi polynomials
- Koornwinder polynomials
- Kostka polynomial
- Kravchuk polynomials
- Laguerre polynomials
- Laurent polynomial
- Linearised polynomial
- Littlewood polynomial
- Legendre polynomials
- Associated Legendre polynomials
  - Spherical harmonic
- Lucas polynomials
- Macdonald polynomials
- Meixner polynomials
- Necklace polynomial
- Newton polynomial
- Orthogonal polynomials
- Orthogonal polynomials on the unit circle
- Permutation polynomial
- Racah polynomials
- Rogers polynomials
- Rogers–Szegő polynomials
- Rook polynomial
- Schur polynomials
- Shapiro polynomials
- Sheffer sequence
- Spread polynomials
- Tricomi–Carlitz polynomials
- Touchard polynomials
- Wilkinson's polynomial
- Wilson polynomials
- Zernike polynomials
  - Pseudo-Zernike polynomials

== Knot polynomials ==
- Alexander polynomial
- HOMFLY polynomial
- Jones polynomial

== Algorithms ==
- Karatsuba multiplication
- Lenstra–Lenstra–Lovász lattice basis reduction algorithm (for polynomial factorization)
- Lindsey–Fox algorithm
- Remez algorithm (to find best approximating polynomials)
- Schönhage–Strassen algorithm

== Other ==
- Polynomial mapping
