= Leonard Carlitz =

American mathematician

- Born: December 26, 1907; Philadelphia, Pennsylvania
- Died: September 17, 1999 (aged 91); Pittsburgh, Pennsylvania
- Education: University of Pennsylvania
- Known for: Carlitz identity Carlitz–Wan conjecture Al-Salam–Carlitz polynomials Tricomi–Carlitz polynomials
- Scientific career
- Fields: Mathematics
- Workplaces: Duke University
- Doctoral advisor: Howard Mitchell
- Doctoral students: Waleed Al-Salam; S. Brent Morris; David Roselle (among 44)

Leonard Carlitz (December 26, 1907 – September 17, 1999) was an American mathematician. Carlitz supervised 44 doctorates at Duke University and published more than 770 papers.

== Chronology ==
- 1907 Born Philadelphia, PA, USA
- 1927 BA, University of Pennsylvania
- 1930 PhD, University of Pennsylvania, 1930 under Howard Mitchell, who had studied under Oswald Veblen at Princeton
- 1930–31 at Caltech with E. T. Bell
- 1931 married Clara Skaler
- 1931–32 at Cambridge with G. H. Hardy
- 1932 Joined the faculty of Duke University where he served for 45 years
- 1938 to 1973 Editorial Board Duke Mathematical Journal (Managing Editor from 1945.)
- 1939 Birth of son Michael
- 1940 Supervision of his first doctoral student E. F. Canaday, awarded 1940
- 1945 Birth of son Robert
- 1964 First James B. Duke Professor in Mathematics
- 1971 Birth of granddaughter Natasha
- 1977 Supervised his 44th and last doctoral student, Jo Ann Lutz, awarded 1977
- 1977 Retired
- 1982 Birth of granddaughter Ruth
- 1990 Death of wife Clara, after 59 years of marriage
- 1999 September 17 Died in Pittsburgh, PA

== Mathematical work ==
- The Carlitz module is generalized by the Drinfeld module
- An identity regarding Bernoulli numbers
- Carlitz wrote about Bessel polynomials
- He introduced Al-Salam–Carlitz polynomials.
- Carlitz' identity for bicentric quadrilaterals
- He conjectured the Carlitz-Wan conjecture, later proved by Daqing Wan.

== Publications ==
Leonard Carlitz published about 771 technical papers comprising approximately 7,000 pages. The effort to edit his collected works, undertaken originally by Professor John Brillhart, is ongoing.

Carlitz' exceptional productivity is described by David Hayes as follows:

During the early 1960s, when I was one of his graduate students, Carlitz had a National Science Foundation grant that paid for a half-time secretary. On more than one day I observed him reading a journal paper raising a question that he found of interest, that evening writing up a paper of his own answering the question, and having it typed and sent off to a journal the following day.

About 160 articles by Carlitz are about finite fields. The textbook by Rudolf Lidl and Harald Niederreiter on the topic has 141 articles authored or coauthored by Carlitz in its reference list.

== See also ==
- Bateman polynomials
- Carlitz exponential
- Carlitz polynomial (disambiguation)
- Maillet's determinant
- Reciprocal Fibonacci constant
