= Factor theorem =

Polynomial zeros related to linear factors

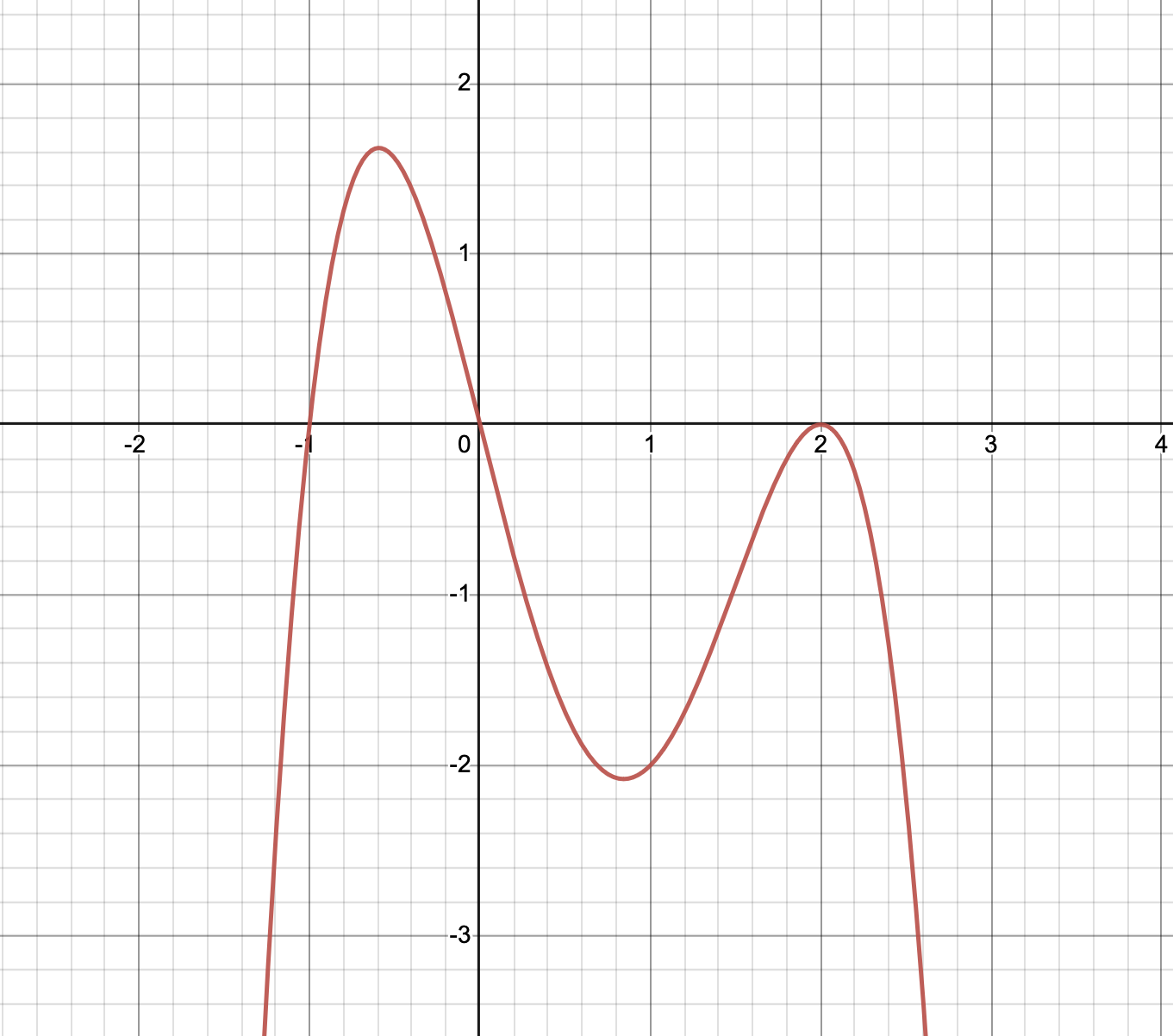

In algebra, the factor theorem connects polynomial factors with polynomial roots. Specifically, if $f(x)$ is a (univariate) polynomial, then $x - a$ is a factor of $f(x)$ if and only if $f (a) = 0$ (that is, $a$ is a root of the polynomial). The theorem is a special case of the polynomial remainder theorem.

The theorem results from basic properties of addition and multiplication. It follows that the theorem holds also when the coefficients and the element $a$ belong to any commutative ring, and not just a field.

In particular, since multivariate polynomials can be viewed as univariate in one of their variables, the following generalization holds : If $f(X_1,\ldots,X_n)$ and $g(X_2, \ldots,X_n)$ are multivariate polynomials and $g$ is independent of $X_1$, then $X_1 - g(X_2, \ldots,X_n)$ is a factor of $f(X_1,\ldots,X_n)$ if and only if $f(g(X_2, \ldots,X_n),X_2, \ldots,X_n)$ is the zero polynomial.

== Factorization of polynomials ==
Two problems where the factor theorem is commonly applied are those of factoring a polynomial and finding the roots of a polynomial equation; it is a direct consequence of the theorem that these problems are essentially equivalent.

The factor theorem is also used to remove known zeros from a polynomial while leaving all unknown zeros intact, thus producing a lower degree polynomial whose zeros may be easier to find. Abstractly, the method is as follows:

1. Deduce the candidate of zero $a$ of the polynomial $f$ from its leading coefficient $a_n$ and constant term $a_0$. (See Rational root theorem.)
2. Use the factor theorem to conclude that $(x-a)$ is a factor of $f(x)$.
3. Compute the polynomial $g(x) = \dfrac{f(x)}{(x-a)}$, for example using polynomial long division or synthetic division.
4. Conclude that any root $x \neq a$ of $f(x)=0$ is a root of $g(x)=0$. Since the polynomial degree of $g$ is one less than that of $f$, it is "simpler" to find the remaining zeros by studying $g$.

Continuing the process until the polynomial $f$ is factored completely, which all its factors is irreducible on $\mathbb{R}[x]$ or $\mathbb{C}[x]$.

=== Example ===
Find the factors of $x^3 + 7x^2 + 8x + 2.$

Solution: Let $p(x)$ be the above polynomial

Constant term = 2
Coefficient of $x^3=1$

All possible factors of 2 are $\pm 1$ and $\pm 2$. Substituting $x=-1$, we get:

$$(-1)^3 + 7(-1)^2 + 8(-1) + 2 = 0$$

So, $(x-(-1))$, i.e., $(x+1)$ is a factor of $p(x)$. On dividing $p(x)$ by $(x+1)$, we get

Quotient = $x^2 + 6x + 2$

Hence, $p(x)=(x^2 + 6x + 2)(x+1)$

Out of these, the quadratic factor can be further factored using the quadratic formula, which gives as roots of the quadratic $-3\pm \sqrt{7}.$ Thus the three irreducible factors of the original polynomial are $x+1,$ $x-(-3+\sqrt{7}),$ and $x-(-3-\sqrt{7}).$

== Proofs ==
Several proofs of the theorem are presented here.

If $x-a$ is a factor of $f(x),$ it is immediate that $f(a)=0.$ So, only the converse will be proved in the following.

=== Proof 1 ===
This proof begins by verifying the statement for $a = 0$. That is, it will show that for any polynomial $f(x)$ for which $f(0) = 0$, there exists a polynomial $g(x)$ such that $f(x) =x\cdot g(x)$. To that end, write $f(x)$ explicitly as $c_0 +c_1 x^1 + \dotsc + c_n x^n$. Now observe that $0 = f(0) = c_0$, so $c_0 = 0$. Thus, $f(x) = x(c_1 + c_2 x^1 + \dotsc + c_{n} x^{n-1}) = x \cdot g(x)$. This case is now proven.

What remains is to prove the theorem for general $a$ by reducing to the $a = 0$ case. To that end, observe that $f(x + a)$ is a polynomial with a root at $x = 0$. By what has been shown above, it follows that $f(x + a) = x \cdot g(x)$ for some polynomial $g(x)$. Finally, $f(x) = f((x - a) + a) = (x - a)\cdot g(x - a)$.

=== Proof 2 ===
First, observe that whenever $x$ and $y$ belong to any commutative ring (the same one) then the identity $x^n - y^n = (x - y)(y^{n-1} + x^1 y^{n-2} + \dotsc + x^{n-2}y^{1} + x^{n-1})$ is true. This is shown by multiplying out the brackets.

Let $f(X) \in R\left[ X \right]$ where $R$ is any commutative ring. Write $f(X) = \sum_i c_i X^i$ for a sequence of coefficients $(c_i)_i$. Assume $f(a) = 0$ for some $a \in R$. Observe then that $f(X) = f(X) - f(a) = \sum_{i} c_i(X^i - a^i)$. Observe that each summand has $X - a$ as a factor by the factorisation of expressions of the form $x^n - y^n$ that was discussed above. Thus, conclude that $X - a$ is a factor of $f(X)$.

=== Proof 3 ===
The theorem may be proved using Euclidean division of polynomials: Perform a Euclidean division of $f(x)$ by $(x-a)$ to obtain $f(x) = (x - a) Q(x)+ R(x)$ where $\deg(R) < \deg(x - a)$. Since $\deg(R) < \deg(x - a)$, it follows that $R$ is constant. Finally, observe that $0 = f(a) = R$. So $f(x) = (x - a)Q(x)$.

The Euclidean division above is possible in every commutative ring since $(x - a)$ is a monic polynomial, and, therefore, the polynomial long division algorithm does not involve any division of coefficients.

=== Corollary of other theorems ===
It is also a corollary of the polynomial remainder theorem, but conversely can be used to show it.

When the polynomials are multivariate but the coefficients form an algebraically closed field, the Nullstellensatz is a significant and deep generalisation.
