= Remainder theorem =

Remainder theorem may refer to:

- Polynomial remainder theorem
- Chinese remainder theorem
