= Ruffini's rule =

Polynomial division computation method

In mathematics, Ruffini's rule is a method for computation of the Euclidean division of a polynomial by a binomial of the form x − r. It was described by Paolo Ruffini in 1809. The rule is a special case of synthetic division in which the divisor is a linear monic factor.

== Algorithm ==
The rule establishes a method for dividing the polynomial:

$$P(x)=a_nx^n+a_{n-1}x^{n-1}+\cdots+a_1x+a_0$$

by the binomial:

$$Q(x)=x-r$$

to obtain the quotient polynomial:

$$R(x)=b_{n-1}x^{n-1}+b_{n-2}x^{n-2}+\cdots+b_1x+b_0.$$

The algorithm is in fact the long division of P(x) by Q(x).

To divide P(x) by Q(x):

1. Take all the coefficients of P(x), including zero for any missing terms, and write them down in order of their decreasing degrees. Then, write r at the bottom-left edge just over the line:
  $$\begin{array}{c|c c c c|c}
& a_n & a_{n-1} & \dots & a_1 & a_0\\
r & & & & & \\
\hline
& & & & & \\
\end{array}$$
2. Pass the leftmost coefficient (a_{n}) to the bottom just under the line.
  $$\begin{array}{c|c c c c|c}
& a_n & a_{n-1} & \dots & a_1 & a_0\\
r & & & & & \\
\hline
& a_n & & & & \\
& =b_{n-1} & & & &
\end{array}$$
3. Multiply the rightmost number under the line by r, and write it over the line and one position to the right.
  $$\begin{array}{c|c c c c|c}
& a_n & a_{n-1} & \dots & a_1 & a_0\\
r & & b_{n-1} \cdot r & & & \\
\hline
& a_n & & & & \\
& =b_{n-1} & & & &
\end{array}$$
4. Add the two values just placed in the same column.
  $$\begin{array}{c|c c c c|c}
& a_n & a_{n-1} & \dots & a_1 & a_0\\
r & & b_{n-1}\cdot r & & & \\
\hline
& a_n & b_{n-1}\cdot r+a_{n-1} & & & \\
& =b_{n-1} & =b_{n-2} & & &
\end{array}$$
5. Repeat steps 3 and 4 until no numbers remain.
  $$\begin{array}{c|c c c c|c}
& a_n & a_{n-1} & \dots & a_1 & a_0 \\
r & & b_{n-1}\cdot r & \dots & b_1\cdot r & b_0 \cdot r \\
\hline
& a_n & b_{n-1} \cdot r+a_{n-1} & \dots & b_1 \cdot r+a_1 & a_0+b_0 \cdot r \\
& =b_{n-1} & =b_{n-2} & \dots & =b_0 & =s \\
\end{array}$$

The b values are the coefficients of the result (R(x)) polynomial, the degree of which is one less than that of P(x). The final value obtained, s, is the remainder. The polynomial remainder theorem asserts that the remainder is equal to P(r), the value of the polynomial at r.

== Example ==
Here is an example of polynomial division as described above.

Let:

$$P(x)=2x^3+3x^2-4\,\!$$
$$Q(x)=x+1.\,\!$$

P(x) will be divided by Q(x) using Ruffini's rule. The main problem is that Q(x) is not a binomial of the form x − r, but rather x + r. Q(x) must be rewritten as

$$Q(x)=x+1=x-(-1).\,\!$$

Now the algorithm is applied:

1. Write down the coefficients and r. Note that, as P(x) didn't contain a coefficient for x, 0 is written:
       |     2     3     0  |  -4
     |                    |               
  -1 |                    |               
 ----|--------------------|-------
     |                    |               
     |                    |               
2. Pass the first coefficient down:
       |     2     3     0  |  -4
     |                    |               
  -1 |                    |               
 ----|--------------------|-------
     |     2              |               
     |                    |               
3. Multiply the last obtained value by r:
       |     2     3     0  |  -4
     |                    |               
  -1 |          -2        |                
 ----|--------------------|-------
     |     2              |               
     |                    |               
4. Add the values:
       |     2     3     0  |  -4
     |                    |
  -1 |          -2        |
 ----|--------------------|-------
     |     2     1        |
     |                    |               
5. Repeat steps 3 and 4 until it's finished:
       |     2     3     0   | -4
     |                     |
  -1 |          -2    -1   |  1
 ----|----------------------------
     |     2     1    -1   | -3
     |{result coefficients}|{remainder}

So, if original number = divisor × quotient + remainder, then

$P(x)=Q(x)R(x)+s\,\!$, where

$R(x) = 2x^2+x-1\,\!$ and $s=-3; \quad \Rightarrow 2x^3+3x^2-4 = (2x^2+x-1)(x+1) - 3\!$

== Application to polynomial factorization ==
Ruffini's rule can be used when one needs the quotient of a polynomial P by a binomial of the form $x-r.$ (When one needs only the remainder, the polynomial remainder theorem provides a simpler method.)

A typical example, where one needs the quotient, is the factorization of a polynomial $p(x)$ for which one knows a root r:

The remainder of the Euclidean division of $p(x)$ by r is 0, and, if the quotient is $q(x),$ the Euclidean division is written as

$$p(x)=q(x)\,(x-r).$$

This gives a (possibly partial) factorization of $p(x),$ which can be computed with Ruffini's rule. Then, $p(x)$ can be further factored by factoring $q(x).$

The fundamental theorem of algebra states that every polynomial of positive degree has at least one complex root. The above process shows the fundamental theorem of algebra implies that every polynomial p(x) = a_{n}x^{n} + a_{n−1}x^{n−1} + ⋯ + a_{1}x + a_{0} can be factored as

$$p(x)=a_n(x-r_1)\cdots(x-r_n),$$

where $r_1,\ldots,r_n$ are complex numbers.

== History ==
The method was invented by Paolo Ruffini, who took part in a competition organized by the Italian Scientific Society (of Forty). The challenge was to devise a method to find the roots of any polynomial. Five submissions were received. In 1804 Ruffini's was awarded first place and his method was published. He later published refinements of his work in 1807 and again in 1813.

== See also ==
- Lill's method, doing the division graphically
- Horner's method
