= Twisted polynomial ring =

In mathematics, a twisted polynomial is a polynomial over a field of characteristic $p$ in the variable $\tau$ representing the Frobenius map $x\mapsto x^p$. In contrast to normal polynomials, multiplication of these polynomials is not commutative, but satisfies the commutation rule

$$\tau x=x^p \tau$$

for all $x$ in the base field.

Over an infinite field, the twisted polynomial ring is isomorphic to the ring of additive polynomials, but where multiplication on the latter is given by composition rather than usual multiplication. However, it is often easier to compute in the twisted polynomial ring — this can be applied especially in the theory of Drinfeld modules.

== Definition ==
Let $k$ be a field of characteristic $p$. The twisted polynomial ring $k\{\tau\}$ is defined as the set of polynomials in the variable $\tau$ and coefficients in $k$. It is endowed with a ring structure with the usual addition, but with a non-commutative multiplication that can be summarized with the relation $\tau x=x^p\tau$ for $x\in k$. Repeated application of this relation yields a formula for the multiplication of any two twisted polynomials.

As an example we perform such a multiplication

$$(a+b\tau)(c+d\tau)=a(c+d\tau)+b\tau(c+d\tau)=ac+ad\tau+bc^p\tau+bd^p\tau^2$$

== Properties ==
The morphism

$$k\{\tau\}\to k[x],\quad a_0+a_1\tau+\cdots+a_n\tau^n\mapsto a_0x+a_1x^p+\cdots+a_nx^{p^n}$$

defines a ring homomorphism sending a twisted polynomial to an additive polynomial. Here, multiplication on the right hand side is given by composition of polynomials. For example

$$(ax+bx^p)\circ (cx+dx^p)=a(cx+dx^p)+b(cx+dx^p)^p=acx+adx^p+bc^px^p+bd^px^{p^2},$$

using the fact that in characteristic $p$ we have the Freshman's dream $(x+y)^p=x^p+y^p$.

The homomorphism is clearly injective, but is surjective if and only if $k$ is infinite. The failure of surjectivity when $k$ is finite is due to the existence of non-zero polynomials which induce the zero function on $k$ (e.g. $x^q-x$ over the finite field with $q$ elements).

Even though this ring is not commutative, it still possesses (left and right) division algorithms.
