= Carlitz exponential =

In mathematics, the Carlitz exponential (named after Leonard Carlitz) is a characteristic p analogue to the usual exponential function studied in real and complex analysis. It is used in the definition of the Carlitz module – an example of a Drinfeld module.

== Definition ==
We work over the polynomial ring F_{q}[T] of one variable over a finite field F_{q} with q elements. The completion C_{∞} of an algebraic closure of the field F_{q}((T^{−1})) of formal Laurent series in T^{−1} will be useful. It is a complete and algebraically closed field.

First we need analogues to the factorials, which appear in the definition of the usual exponential function. For i > 0 we define

$$[i] := T^{q^i} - T, \,$$
$$D_i := \prod_{1 \le j \le i} [j]^{q^{i - j}}$$

and D_{0} := 1. Note that the usual factorial is inappropriate here, since n! vanishes in F_{q}[T] unless n is smaller than the characteristic of F_{q}[T].

Using this we define the Carlitz exponential e_{C}:C_{∞} → C_{∞} by the convergent sum

$$e_C(x) := \sum_{i = 0}^\infty \frac{x^{q^i}}{D_i}.$$

== Relation to the Carlitz module ==
The Carlitz exponential satisfies the functional equation

$$e_C(Tx) = Te_C(x) + \left(e_C(x)\right)^q = (T + \tau)e_C(x), \,$$

where we may view $\tau$ as the power of $q$ map or as an element of the ring $F_q(T)\{\tau\}$ of noncommutative polynomials. By the universal property of polynomial rings in one variable this extends to a ring homomorphism ψ:F_{q}[T]→C_{∞}{τ}, defining a Drinfeld F_{q}[T]-module over C_{∞}{τ}. It is called the Carlitz module.
