= S. Brent Morris =

American author

S. Brent Morris is an American author who writes on Freemasonry. He is a Master Mason, a 33° Scottish Rite Mason, and retired in 2021 as the editor of The Scottish Rite Journal, a publication of the Supreme Council of the Scottish Rite Southern Jurisdiction.

Morris has served as Executive of the Cryptologic Mathematician Program at the National Security Agency and as U.S. representative to the International Organization for Standardization (ISO) in the area of computer security. He has taught mathematics, computer science, and cryptanalysis at Duke University, Johns Hopkins University, and the National Cryptologic School. His interests include computer interconnection networks, the mathematics of card shuffling, and recreational mathematics.

Morris has been nominated by The Mathematical Association of America to be one of the USA Science and Engineering Festival's Nifty Fifty Speakers who will speak about his work and career to middle and high school students in October 2010.

As a Mason, he was the first American to be elected as the Worshipful Master of Quatuor Coronati Lodge, the oldest Masonic Research Lodge in the world and under the jurisdiction of the United Grand Lodge of England, serving in that capacity from November 2007 to November 2008. He is a recipient of the Grand Cross. He holds a PhD in mathematics from Duke University, advised by Leonard Carlitz.

== Books ==
- Magic Tricks, Card Shuffling and Dynamic Computer Memories (Mathematical Association of America, 1998)
- Freemasonry on Both Sides of the Atlantic: Essays Concerning the Craft in the British Isles, Europe, United States and Mexico (edited with R. William Weisberger and Wallace McLeod, Columbia University Press, 2002)
- American Masonic Periodicals, 1811–2001: A Bibliography of the Library of the Supreme Council (edited with Larissa P. Watkins, Oak Knoll Press, 2004)
- International Masonic Periodicals, 1738–2005 (edited with Larissa P. Watkins, Oak Knoll Press, 2006)
- Why Thirty-Three? Searching for Masonic Origins (Westphalia Press, 2019)
