= Carlitz polynomial =

In mathematics, Carlitz polynomial, named for Leonard Carlitz, may refer to:

- Al-Salam–Carlitz polynomials
- Tricomi–Carlitz polynomials
