= Drinfeld module =

Concept in mathematics

In mathematics, a Drinfeld module (or elliptic module) is roughly a special kind of module over a ring of functions on a curve over a finite field, generalizing the Carlitz module. Loosely speaking, they provide a function field analogue of complex multiplication theory. A shtuka (also called F-sheaf or chtouca) is a sort of generalization of a Drinfeld module, consisting roughly of a vector bundle over a curve, together with some extra structure identifying a "Frobenius twist" of the bundle with a "modification" of it.

Drinfeld modules were introduced by Drinfeld (1974), who used them to prove the Langlands conjectures for GL_{2} of an algebraic function field in some special cases. He later invented shtukas and used shtukas of rank 2 to prove the remaining cases of the Langlands conjectures for GL_{2}. Laurent Lafforgue proved the Langlands conjectures for GL_{n} of a function field by studying the moduli stack of shtukas of rank n.

"Shtuka" is a Russian word штука meaning "a single copy", which comes from the German noun “Stück”, meaning “piece, item, or unit". In Russian, the word "shtuka" is also used in slang for a thing with known properties, but having no name in a speaker's mind.

== Drinfeld modules ==
=== The ring of additive polynomials ===
We let $L$ be a field of characteristic $p>0$. The ring $L\{\tau\}$ is defined to be the ring of noncommutative (or twisted) polynomials $a_0+a_1\tau+a_2\tau^2+\cdots$ over $L$, with the multiplication given by

$$\tau a = a^p\tau,\quad a\in L.$$

The element $\tau$ can be thought of as a Frobenius element: in fact, $L$ is a left module over $L\{\tau\}$, with elements of $L$ acting as multiplication and $\tau$ acting as the Frobenius endomorphism of $L$. The ring $L\{\tau\}$ can also be thought of as the ring of all (absolutely) additive polynomials

$$a_0x+a_1x^p+a_2x^{p^2}+\cdots = a_0\tau^0+a_1\tau+a_2\tau^2+\cdots \,$$

in $L[x]$, where a polynomial $f$ is called additive if $f(x+y) = f(x)+f(y)$ (as elements of $L[x,y]$). The ring of additive polynomials is generated as an algebra over $L$ by the polynomial $\tau = x^p$. The multiplication in the ring of additive polynomials is given by composition of polynomials, not by multiplication of commutative polynomials, and is not commutative.

=== Definition of Drinfeld modules ===
Let F be an algebraic function field with a finite field of constants and fix a place $\infty$ of F. Define A to be the ring of elements in F that are regular at every place except possibly $\infty$. In particular, A is a Dedekind domain and it is discrete in F (with the topology induced by $\infty$). For example, we may take A to be the polynomial ring $F_q[t]$. Let L be a field equipped with a ring homomorphism $\iota:A\to L$.

A Drinfeld A-module over L is a ring homomorphism $\phi:A\to L\{\tau\}$ whose image is not contained in L, such that the composition of $\phi$ with $d:L\{\tau\}\to L,\,a_0+a_1\tau+\cdots\mapsto a_0$ coincides with $\iota:A\to L$.

The condition that the image of A is not in L is a non-degeneracy condition, put in to eliminate trivial cases, while the condition that $d\circ \phi=\iota$ gives the impression that a Drinfeld module is simply a deformation of the map $\iota$.

As L{τ} can be thought of as endomorphisms of the additive group of L, a Drinfeld A-module can be regarded as an action of A on the additive group of L, or in other words as an A-module whose underlying additive group is the additive group of L.

=== Examples of Drinfeld modules ===
- Define A to be F_{p}[T], the usual (commutative!) ring of polynomials over the finite field of order p. In other words, A is the coordinate ring of an affine genus 0 curve. Then a Drinfeld module ψ is determined by the image ψ(T) of T, which can be any non-constant element of L{τ}. So Drinfeld modules can be identified with non-constant elements of L{τ}. (In the higher genus case the description of Drinfeld modules is more complicated.)
- The Carlitz module is the Drinfeld module ψ given by ψ(T) = T+τ, where A is F_{p}[T] and L is a suitable complete algebraically closed field containing A. It was described by L. Carlitz in 1935, many years before the general definition of Drinfeld module. See chapter 3 of Goss (1996) for more information about the Carlitz module. See also Carlitz exponential.

== Shtukas ==
Suppose that X is a curve over the finite field F_{p}. A (right) shtuka of rank r over a scheme (or stack) U is given by the following data:

- Locally free sheaves E, E′ of rank r over U×X together with injective morphisms

E → E′ ← (Fr×1)^{*}E,

whose cokernels are supported on certain graphs of morphisms from U to X (called the zero and pole of the shtuka, and usually denoted by 0 and ∞), and are locally free of rank 1 on their supports. Here (Fr×1)^{*}E is the pullback of E by the Frobenius endomorphism of U.

A left shtuka is defined in the same way except that the direction of the morphisms is reversed. If the pole and zero of the shtuka are disjoint then left shtukas and right shtukas are essentially the same.

By varying U, we get an algebraic stack Shtuka^{r} of shtukas of rank r, a "universal" shtuka over Shtuka^{r}×X and a morphism (∞,0) from Shtuka^{r} to X×X which is smooth and of relative dimension 2r − 2. The stack Shtuka^{r} is not of finite type for r > 1.

Drinfeld modules are in some sense special kinds of shtukas. (This is not at all obvious from the definitions.) More precisely, Drinfeld showed how to construct a shtuka from a Drinfeld module. See Drinfeld, V. G. Commutative subrings of certain noncommutative rings. Funkcional. Anal. i Prilovzen. 11 (1977), no. 1, 11–14, 96. for details.

== Applications ==
The Langlands conjectures for function fields state (very roughly) that there is a bijection between cuspidal automorphic representations of GL_{n} and certain representations of a Galois group. Drinfeld used Drinfeld modules to prove some special cases of the Langlands conjectures, and later proved the full Langlands conjectures for GL_{2} by generalizing Drinfeld modules to shtukas. The "hard" part of proving these conjectures is to construct Galois representations with certain properties, and Drinfeld constructed the necessary Galois representations by finding them inside the l-adic cohomology of certain moduli spaces of rank 2 shtukas.

Drinfeld suggested that moduli spaces of shtukas of rank r could be used in a similar way to prove the Langlands conjectures for GL_{r}; the formidable technical problems involved in carrying out this program were solved by Lafforgue after many years of effort.

== See also ==
- Level structure (algebraic geometry)
- Moduli stack of elliptic curves
