= Dwork conjecture =

In mathematics, the Dwork unit root zeta function, named after Bernard Dwork, is the L-function attached to the p-adic Galois representation arising from the p-adic etale cohomology of an algebraic variety defined over a global function field of characteristic p. The Dwork conjecture (1973) states that his unit root zeta function is p-adic meromorphic everywhere. This conjecture was proved by Wan (2000).
