= Daqing Wan =

Chinese mathematician (born 1964)

- 万大庆
- Born: 1964 (age 61–62)
- Education: Sichuan University; Chengdu University of Technology; University of Washington
- Scientific career
- Fields: Mathematics
- Workplaces: Chongqing University
- Doctoral advisor: Neal Koblitz

Daqing Wan (born 1964 in China) is a Chinese mathematician, who after working in the United States for near 40 years, he moved to Chongqing University in 2025. He received his Ph.D. from the University of Washington in 1991, under the direction of Neal Koblitz.

Between 1997 and 2025 he was on the faculty of mathematics at the University of California, Irvine. He also held visiting positions at the Institute for Advanced Study, Pennsylvania State University, the University of Rennes, the Mathematical Sciences Research Institute, and the Chinese Academy of Sciences.

His primary interests include number theory and arithmetic algebraic geometry, particularly zeta functions over finite fields. He is known for his proof of Dwork's conjecture that the p-adic unit root zeta function attached to a family of varieties over a finite field of characteristic p is p-adic meromorphic.

In 2001 he received the Morningside Silver Medal awarded to exceptional mathematicians of Chinese descent under the age of 45.

Wan, a renowned mathematician and former child prodigy, has left California to return to his hometown of Chongqing. Amid intense competition among Chinese universities, he has taken a new position in his home city.

== See also ==
- Carlitz–Wan conjecture
- Dwork conjecture
