= Carlitz–Wan conjecture =

In mathematics, the Carlitz–Wan conjecture classifies the possible degrees of exceptional polynomials over a finite field F_{q} of q elements. A polynomial f(x) in F_{q}[x] of degree d is called exceptional over F_{q} if every irreducible factor (differing from x − y) or (f(x) − f(y))/(x − y)) over F_{q} becomes reducible over the algebraic closure of F_{q}. If q > d^{4}, then f(x) is exceptional if and only if f(x) is a permutation polynomial over F_{q}.

The Carlitz–Wan conjecture states that there are no exceptional polynomials of degree d over F_{q} if gcd(d, q − 1) > 1.

In the special case that q is odd and d is even, this conjecture was proposed by Leonard Carlitz (1966) and proved by Fried, Guralnick, and Saxl (1993). The general form of the Carlitz–Wan conjecture was proposed by Daqing Wan (1993) and later proved by Hendrik Lenstra (1995).
