= Additive polynomial =

Topic in algebraic number theory

In mathematics, the additive polynomials are an important topic in classical algebraic number theory.

== Definition ==
Let $k$ be a field of prime characteristic $k$. A polynomial $P(x)$ with coefficients in $k$ is called an additive polynomial, or a Frobenius polynomial, if

$$P(a+b)=P(a)+P(b)$$

as polynomials in $a$ and $b$. It is equivalent to assume that this equality holds for all $a$ and $b$ in some infinite field containing $k$, such as its algebraic closure.

Occasionally absolutely additive is used for the condition above, and additive is used for the weaker condition that $P(a+b)=P(a)+P(b)$ for all $a$ and $b$ in the field. For infinite fields the conditions are equivalent, but for finite fields they are not, and the weaker condition is the "wrong" as it does not behave well. For example, over a field of order $q$ any multiple $P$ of $x^q-x$ will satisfy $P(a+b)=P(a)+P(b)$ for all $a$ and $b$ in the field, but will usually not be (absolutely) additive.

== Examples ==
The polynomial $x^p$ is additive. Indeed, for any $a$ and $b$ in the algebraic closure of $k$ one has by the binomial theorem

$$(a+b)^p = \sum_{n=0}^p {p \choose n} a^n b^{p-n}.$$

Since $p$ is prime, for all $n=1,\dots,p-1$ the binomial coefficient $\tbinom{p}{n}$ is divisible by $p$, which implies that

$$(a+b)^p \equiv a^p+b^p \mod p$$

as polynomials in $a$ and $b$.

Similarly all the polynomials of the form

$$\tau_p^n(x) = x^{p^n}$$

are additive, where $n$ is a non-negative integer.

The definition makes sense even if $k$ is a field of characteristic zero, but in this case the only additive polynomials are those of the form $ax$ for some $a$ in $k$.

== The ring of additive polynomials ==
It is quite easy to prove that any linear combination of polynomials $\tau_p^n(x)$ with coefficients in $k$ is also an additive polynomial. An interesting question is whether there are other additive polynomials except these linear combinations. The answer is that these are the only ones.

One can check that if $P(x)$ and $M(x)$ are additive polynomials, then so are $P(x)+M(x)$ and $P(M(x))$. These imply that the additive polynomials form a ring under polynomial addition and composition. This ring is denoted

$$k\{ \tau_p\}.$$

This ring is not commutative unless $k$ is the field $\mathbb{F}_p = \mathbb{Z}/p\mathbb{Z}$ (see modular arithmetic). Indeed, consider the additive polynomials $ax$ and $x^p$ for a coefficient $a$ in $k$. For them to commute under composition, we must have

$$(ax)^p = ax^p,\,$$

and hence $a^p-a=0$. This is false for $a$ not a root of this equation, that is, for $a$ outside $\mathbb{F}_p.$

== The fundamental theorem of additive polynomials ==
Let $P(x)$ be a polynomial with coefficients in $k$, and $\{w_1,\dots,w_m\}\subset k$ be the set of its roots. Assuming that the roots of $P(x)$ are distinct (that is, $P(x)$ is separable), then $P(x)$ is additive if and only if the set $\{w_1,\dots,w_m\}$ forms a group with the field addition.

== See also ==
- Drinfeld module
- Additive map
