= Primitive polynomial =

In different branches of mathematics, primitive polynomial may refer to:

- Primitive polynomial (field theory), a minimal polynomial of an extension of finite fields
- Primitive polynomial (ring theory), a polynomial with coprime coefficients
