= Bernard Dwork =

American mathematician

- Born: May 27, 1923; New York City, US
- Died: May 9, 1998 (aged 74); New Brunswick, New Jersey, US
- Education: Columbia University
- Known for: Dwork conjecture Dwork family Dwork's lemma Dwork's method
- Awards: Guggenheim Fellowship (1964); Cole Prize (1962); ICM Speaker (1962)
- Scientific career
- Fields: Mathematics
- Workplaces: Johns Hopkins University; Princeton University
- Doctoral advisor: Emil Artin; John Tate
- Doctoral students: Stefan Burr; Nick Katz

Bernard Morris Dwork (May 27, 1923 – May 9, 1998) was an American mathematician, known for his application of p-adic analysis to local zeta functions, and in particular for a proof of the first part of the Weil conjectures: the rationality of the zeta function of a variety over a finite field. The general theme of Dwork's research was p-adic cohomology and p-adic differential equations. He published two papers under the pseudonym Maurizio Boyarsky.

== Career ==
Dwork studied electrical engineering at the City College of New York and Brooklyn Polytechnic Institute. He served in the Pacific theater of World War II.

He received his Ph.D. at Columbia University in 1954 under direction of Emil Artin (his formal advisor was John Tate); Nick Katz was one of his students.

He spent 3 years at Harvard University and 7 years at Johns Hopkins University before joining Princeton University as a faculty member in 1964. He became Eugene Higgins Professor of Mathematics in 1978 and became emeritus in 1993. He was named a Professore di Chiara Fama by the Italian government and held a special chair at the University of Padua from 1992 onwards.

== Awards and honors ==
For his proof of the first part of the Weil conjectures, Dwork received (together with Kenkichi Iwasawa) the Cole Prize in 1962. He received a Guggenheim Fellowship in 1964.

== Personal life ==
Dwork was married to Shirley Dwork and is the father of computer scientist Cynthia Dwork, historian Deborah Dwork, and Andrew Dwork.

== See also ==
- Crystalline cohomology
- Gross–Koblitz formula
- Langlands–Deligne local constant
- p-adic gamma function
