= Actuarial polynomials =

In mathematics, the actuarial polynomials a^{(β)}_{n}(x) are polynomials given by the generating function

$$\displaystyle \sum_n \frac{a_n^{(\beta)}(x)}{n!}t^n = \exp(\beta t +x(1-e^t))$$

== See also ==
- Umbral calculus
