= Maillet's determinant =

In mathematics, Maillet's determinant D_{p} is the determinant of the matrix introduced by Maillet (1913) whose entries are R(s/r) for s,r = 1, 2, ..., (p – 1)/2 ∈ Z/pZ for an odd prime p, where and R(a) is the least positive residue of a modulo p (Muir 1930, pages 340–342).

== Determinant value ==
Malo (1914) calculated the determinant D_{p} for p = 3, 5, 7, 11, 13 and found that in these cases it is given by (–p)^{(p – 3)/2}, and conjectured that it is given by this formula in general. Carlitz & Olson (1955) showed that this conjecture is incorrect; the determinant in general is given by D_{p} = (–p)^{(p – 3)/2}h^{−}, where h^{−} is the first factor of the class number of the cyclotomic field generated by pth roots of 1, which happens to be 1 for p less than 23. In particular, this verifies Maillet's conjecture that the determinant is always non-zero. Chowla and Weil had previously found the same formula but did not publish it. Their results have been extended to all non-prime odd numbers by Wang (1984).
