= Caloric polynomial =

In differential equations, the $m$th-degree caloric polynomial (or heat polynomial) is the polynomial

$$P_m(x,t) = \sum_{\ell=0}^{\lfloor m/2 \rfloor} \frac{m!}{\ell!(m - 2\ell)!} x^{m - 2\ell} t^\ell$$

that satisfies the heat equation

$$\frac{\partial P}{\partial t} = \frac{\partial^2 P}{\partial x^2}.$$

It is parabolically $m$-homogeneous in the sense that

$$P(\lambda x, \lambda^2 t) = \lambda^m P(x,t)$$

for $\lambda > 0$. Setting $t=-1/2$ reduces the polynomial to the $m$th-degree Hermite polynomial in $x$.
