= Polynomial remainder theorem =

On the remainder of division by x – r

In algebra, the polynomial remainder theorem or little Bézout's theorem (named after Étienne Bézout) is an application of Euclidean division of polynomials. It states that, for every number $r$, any polynomial $f(x)$ is the sum of $f(r)$ and the product of $x-r$ and a polynomial in $x$ of a degree one less than the degree of $f$. In particular, $f(r)$ is the remainder of the Euclidean division of $f(x)$ by $x-r$, and $x-r$ is a divisor of $f(x)$ if and only if $f(r)=0$, a property known as the factor theorem.

== Examples ==
=== Example 1 ===
Let $f(x) = x^3 - 12x^2 - 42$. Polynomial division of $f(x)$ by $(x-3)$ gives the quotient $x^2 - 9x - 27$ and the remainder $-123$. By the polynomial remainder theorem, $f(3)=-123$.

=== Example 2 ===
Proof that the polynomial remainder theorem holds for an arbitrary second degree polynomial $f(x) = ax^2 + bx + c$ by using algebraic manipulation:
$$\begin{align}
f(x)-f(r)
&= ax^2+bx+c-(ar^2+br+c)\\
&= a(x^2-r^2)+ b(x-r)\\
&= a(x-r)(x+r)+b(x-r)\\
&= (x-r)(ax +ar+ b)
\end{align}$$

So,
$$f(x) = (x - r)(ax + ar + b) + f(r),$$
which is exactly the formula of Euclidean division.

The generalization of this proof to any degree is given below in § Direct proof.

== Proofs ==
=== Using Euclidean division ===
The polynomial remainder theorem follows from the theorem of Euclidean division, which, given two polynomials f(x) (the dividend) and g(x) (the divisor), asserts the existence (and the uniqueness) of a quotient Q(x) and a remainder R(x) such that

$$f(x)=Q(x)g(x) + R(x)\quad \text{and}\quad R(x) = 0 \ \text{ or } \deg(R)<\deg(g).$$

If the divisor is $g(x) = x-r,$ where r is a constant, then either R(x) = 0 or its degree is zero; in both cases, R(x) is a constant that is independent of x; that is

$$f(x)=Q(x)(x-r) + R.$$

Setting $x=r$ in this formula, we obtain:

$$f(r)=R.$$

=== Direct proof ===
A constructive proof—that does not involve the existence theorem of Euclidean division—uses the identity

$$x^k-r^k=(x-r)(x^{k-1}+x^{k-2}r+\dots+xr^{k-2}+r^{k-1}).$$

If $S_{k}$ denotes the large factor in the right-hand side of this identity, and

$$f(x)=a_nx^n+a_{n-1}x^{n-1} + \cdots + a_1x +a_0,$$

one has

$$f(x)-f(r)=(x-r)(a_n S_n +\cdots + a_2S_2 +a_1),$$

(since $S_1=1$).

Adding $f(r)$ to both sides of this equation, one gets simultaneously the polynomial remainder theorem and the existence part of the theorem of Euclidean division for this specific case.

== Applications ==
The polynomial remainder theorem may be used to evaluate $f(r)$ by calculating the remainder, $R$. Although polynomial long division is more difficult than evaluating the function itself, synthetic division is computationally easier. Thus, the function may be more "cheaply" evaluated using synthetic division and the polynomial remainder theorem.

The factor theorem is another application of the remainder theorem: if the remainder is zero, then the linear divisor is a factor. Repeated application of the factor theorem may be used to factorize the polynomial.
