= Heaviside (disambiguation) =

Oliver Heaviside (1850–1925) was a mathematician and physicist.

Heaviside may also refer to:

== Science ==
- Heaviside (lunar crater)
- Heaviside (Martian crater)
- Heaviside condition
- Heaviside cover-up method
- Heaviside layer or Kennelly–Heaviside layer
- Heaviside step function
- Heaviside's dolphin, named in honour of 19th-century mariner Captain H(e)aviside

== People ==
- John Heaviside (footballer) (born 1943), English footballer
- John Heaviside Clark (c. 1771–1836), Scottish artist
- Michael Heaviside (1880–1939), Victoria Cross recipient
- Oliver Heaviside (1850-1925), English electrical engineer

== Others ==
- Heaviside, an electric-powered aircraft under development by the Kitty Hawk Corporation
