= Integral expression =

Integral expression may refer to:

- Integral equation

- More generally, a mathematical expression involving one or more integrals

- Integer polynomial
- An algebraic expression which is not in fractional form, see algebraic fraction
