= John Heaviside =

John Heaviside may refer to:

- John Heaviside (footballer)
- John Heaviside (surgeon)
