= Irreducible fraction =

Fully simplified fraction

An irreducible fraction (or fraction in lowest terms, simplest form or reduced fraction) is a fraction in which the numerator and denominator are integers that have no other common divisors than 1 (and −1, when negative numbers are considered). In other words, a fraction a/b is irreducible if and only if a and b are coprime, that is, if a and b have a greatest common divisor of 1. In higher mathematics, "irreducible fraction" may also refer to rational fractions such that the numerator and the denominator are coprime polynomials. Every rational number can be represented as an irreducible fraction with positive denominator in exactly one way.

An equivalent definition is sometimes useful: if a and b are integers, then the fraction a/b is irreducible if and only if there is no other equal fraction c/d such that |c| < |a| or |d| < |b|, where |a| means the absolute value of a. (Two fractions a/b and c/d are equal or equivalent if and only if ad = bc.)

For example, 1/4, 5/6, and (−101)/100 are all irreducible fractions. On the other hand, 2/4 is reducible since it is equal in value to 1/2, and the numerator of 1/2 is less than the numerator of 2/4.

A fraction that is reducible can be reduced by dividing both the numerator and denominator by a common factor. It can be fully reduced to lowest terms if both are divided by their greatest common divisor. In order to find the greatest common divisor, the Euclidean algorithm or prime factorization can be used. The Euclidean algorithm is commonly preferred because it allows one to reduce fractions with numerators and denominators too large to be easily factored.

== Examples ==
$$\frac{120}{90}=\frac{12}{9}=\frac{4}{3}$$

In the first step both numbers were divided by 10, which is a factor common to both 120 and 90. In the second step, they were divided by 3. The final result, 4/3, is an irreducible fraction because 4 and 3 have no common factors other than 1.

The original fraction could have also been reduced in a single step by using the greatest common divisor of 90 and 120, which is 30. As 120 ÷ 30 = 4, and 90 ÷ 30 = 3, one gets

$$\frac{120}{90}=\frac{4}{3}$$

Which method is faster "by hand" depends on the fraction and the ease with which common factors are spotted. In case a denominator and numerator remain that are too large to ensure they are coprime by inspection, a greatest common divisor computation is needed anyway to ensure the fraction is actually irreducible.

== Uniqueness ==
Every rational number has a unique representation as an irreducible fraction with a positive denominator (however 2/3 = (−2)/(−3) although both are irreducible). Uniqueness is a consequence of the unique prime factorization of integers, since a/b = c/d implies ad = bc, and so both sides of the latter must share the same prime factorization, yet a and b share no prime factors so the set of prime factors of a (with multiplicity) is a subset of those of c and vice versa, meaning a = c and by the same argument b = d.

== Applications ==
The fact that any rational number has a unique representation as an irreducible fraction is utilized in various proofs of the irrationality of the square root of 2 and of other irrational numbers. For example, one proof notes that if $\sqrt{2}$ could be represented as a ratio of integers, then it would have in particular the fully reduced representation a/b where a and b are the smallest possible; but given that a/b equals $\sqrt{2}$ so does (2b − a)/(a − b) (since cross-multiplying this with a/b shows that they are equal). Since a > b (because $\sqrt{2}$ is greater than 1), the latter is a ratio of two smaller integers. This is a contradiction, so the premise that the square root of two has a representation as the ratio of two integers is false.

== Generalization ==
The notion of irreducible fraction generalizes to the field of fractions of any unique factorization domain: any element of such a field can be written as a fraction in which denominator and numerator are coprime, by dividing both by their greatest common divisor. This applies notably to rational expressions over a field. The irreducible fraction for a given element is unique up to multiplication of denominator and numerator by the same invertible element. In the case of the rational numbers this means that any number has two irreducible fractions, related by a change of sign of both numerator and denominator; this ambiguity can be removed by requiring the denominator to be positive. In the case of rational functions the denominator could similarly be required to be a monic polynomial.

== See also ==
- Anomalous cancellation, an erroneous arithmetic procedure that produces the correct irreducible fraction by cancelling digits of the original unreduced form.
- Diophantine approximation, the approximation of real numbers by rational numbers.
