= Clearing denominators =

Method for simplifying equations

In mathematics, the method of clearing denominators, also called clearing fractions, is a technique for simplifying an equation equating two expressions that each are a sum of rational expressions – which includes simple fractions.

== Example ==
Consider the equation

$$\frac x 6 + \frac y {15z} = 1.$$

The smallest common multiple of the two denominators 6 and 15z is 30z, so one multiplies both sides by 30z:

$$5xz + 2y = 30z. \,$$

The result is an equation with no fractions.

The simplified equation is not entirely equivalent to the original. For when we substitute y = 0 and z = 0 in the last equation, both sides simplify to 0, so we get 0 = 0, a mathematical truth. But the same substitution applied to the original equation results in x/6 + 0/0 = 1, which is mathematically meaningless.

== Description ==
Without loss of generality, we may assume that the right-hand side of the equation is 0, since an equation E_{1} = E_{2} may equivalently be rewritten in the form E_{1} − E_{2} = 0.

So let the equation have the form

$$\sum_{i=1}^n \frac{P_i}{Q_i} = 0.$$

The first step is to determine a common denominator D of these fractions – preferably the least common denominator, which is the least common multiple of the Q_{i}.

This means that each Q_{i} is a factor of D, so D = R_{i}Q_{i} for some expression R_{i} that is not a fraction. Then

$$\frac{P_i}{Q_i} = \frac{R_i P_i}{R_i Q_i} = \frac{R_i P_i} D \,,$$

provided that R_{i}Q_{i} does not assume the value 0 – in which case also D equals 0.

So we have now

$$\sum_{i=1}^n \frac{P_i}{Q_i} = \sum_{i=1}^n \frac{R_i P_i} D = \frac 1 D \sum_{i=1}^n R_i P_i = 0.$$

Provided that D does not assume the value 0, the latter equation is equivalent with

$$\sum_{i=1}^n R_i P_i = 0\,,$$

in which the denominators have vanished.

As shown by the provisos, care has to be taken not to introduce zeros of D – viewed as a function of the unknowns of the equation – as spurious solutions.

== Example 2 ==
Consider the equation

$$\frac{1}{x(x+1)}+\frac{1}{x(x+2)}-\frac{1}{(x+1)(x+2)} = 0.$$

The least common denominator is x(x + 1)(x + 2).

Following the method as described above results in

$$(x+2)+(x+1)-x = 0.$$

Simplifying this further gives us the solution x = −3.

It is easily checked that none of the zeros of x(x + 1)(x + 2) – namely x = 0, x = −1, and x = −2 – is a solution of the final equation, so no spurious solutions were introduced.
