= Constant term =

Term in an algebraic expression which does not contain any variables

In mathematics, a constant term (sometimes referred to as a free term) is a term in an algebraic expression that does not contain any variables and therefore is constant. For example, in the quadratic polynomial $x^2 + 2x + 3$, the number 3 is a constant term.

After like terms are combined, an algebraic expression will have at most one constant term. Thus, it is common to speak of the quadratic polynomial $ax^2+bx+c$, where $x$ is the variable, as having a constant term of $c$. If the constant term is 0, then it will conventionally be omitted when the quadratic is written out.

Any polynomial written in standard form has a unique constant term, which can be considered a coefficient of $x^0$. In particular, the constant term will always be the lowest degree term of the polynomial. This also applies to multivariate polynomials. For example, the polynomial $x^2+2xy+y^2-2x+2y-4$ has a constant term of −4, which can be considered to be the coefficient of $x^0y^0$, where the variables are eliminated by being exponentiated to 0 (since any non-zero number exponentiated to 0 becomes 1). For any polynomial, the constant term can be obtained by substituting in 0 instead of each variable; thus, eliminating each variable. The concept of exponentiation to 0 can be applied to power series and other types of series, for example in this power series:
$$a_0 + a_1 x + a_2 x^2 + a_3 x^3 + \cdots$$
$a_0$ is the constant term.

== Constant of integration ==
The derivative of a constant term is 0, so when a term containing a constant term is differentiated, the constant term vanishes, regardless of its value. Therefore the antiderivative is only determined up to an unknown constant term, which is called "the constant of integration" and added in symbolic form (usually denoted as $C$).

For example, the antiderivative of $\cos x$ is $\sin x$, since the derivative of $\sin x$ is equal to $\cos x$ based on the properties of trigonometric derivatives.

However, the integral of $\cos x$ is equal to $\sin x$ (the antiderivative), plus an arbitrary constant:

$$\int \cos x \, \mathrm dx = \sin x + C,$$

because for any constant $C$, the derivative of the right-hand side of the equation is equal to the left-hand side of the equation.

== See also ==
- Constant (mathematics)
