= Solution set =

Set of values which satisfy a given set of equations

In mathematics, the solution set of a system of equations or inequality is the set of all its solutions, that is the values that satisfy all equations and inequalities. Also, the solution set or the truth set of a statement or a predicate is the set of all values that satisfy it.

If there is no solution, the solution set is the empty set.

== Examples ==
- The solution set of the single equation $x=0$ is the singleton set $\{ 0 \}$.
- Since there do not exist numbers $x$ and $y$ making the two equations
  $$\begin{cases} x + 2y = 3,&\\   x + 2y = -3 \end{cases}$$
  simultaneously true, the solution set of this system is the empty set $\emptyset$.
- The solution set of a constrained optimization problem is its feasible region.
- The truth set of the predicate $P(n): n \mathrm{\ is\ even}$ is $\{ 2,4,6,8,\ldots \}$.

== Remarks ==
In algebraic geometry, solution sets are called algebraic sets if there are no inequalities. Over the reals, and with inequalities, there are called semialgebraic sets.

== Other meanings ==
More generally, the solution set to an arbitrary collection E of relations (E_{i}) (i varying in some index set I) for a collection of unknowns ${(x_j)}_{j\in J}$, supposed to take values in respective spaces ${(X_j)}_{j\in J}$, is the set S of all solutions to the relations E, where a solution $x^{(k)}$ is a family of values ${\left( x^{(k)}_j \right)}_{j\in J}\in \prod_{j\in J} X_j$ such that substituting ${\left(x_j\right)}_{j\in J}$ by $x^{(k)}$ in the collection E makes all relations "true".

(Instead of relations depending on unknowns, one should speak more correctly of predicates, the collection E is their logical conjunction, and the solution set is the inverse image of the Boolean value true by the associated Boolean-valued function.)

The above meaning is a special case of this one, if the set of polynomials f_{i} if interpreted as the set of equations f_{i}(x)=0.

=== Examples ===
- The solution set for E = { x+y = 0 } with respect to $(x,y)\in \R^2$ is S = { (a,−a) : a ∈ R }.
- The solution set for E = { x+y = 0 } with respect to $x \in \R$ is S = { −y }. (Here, y is not "declared" as an unknown, and thus to be seen as a parameter on which the equation, and therefore the solution set, depends.)
- The solution set for $E = \{ \sqrt x \le 4 \}$ with respect to $x\in\R$ is the interval S = [0,16] (since $\sqrt x$ is undefined for negative values of x).
- The solution set for $E = \{ e^{i x} = 1 \}$ with respect to $x\in\Complex$ is S = 2πZ (see Euler's identity).

== See also ==
- Equation solving
- Extraneous and missing solutions
- Equaliser (mathematics)
