= John Heaviside (footballer) =

English footballer

Personal information
- Full name: John Heaviside
- Date of birth: 7 October 1943
- Place of birth: Ferryhill, England
- Position: Left back

Senior career*
Years	Team	Apps	(Gls)
–	Bishops Middleham		
1963–1964	Darlington	2	(0)
–	Spennymoor United		
- * Club domestic league appearances and goals

John Heaviside (born 7 October 1943) is an English former amateur footballer who played in the Football League as a left back for Darlington. He also played non-league football for Bishops Middleham and Spennymoor United.
