= Extraneous and missing solutions =

Types of solutions in mathematics

In mathematics, an extraneous solution (or spurious solution) is one which emerges from the process of solving a problem but is not a valid solution to it. A missing solution is a valid one which is lost during the solution process. Both situations frequently result from performing operations that are not invertible for some or all values of the variables involved, which prevents the chain of logical implications from being bidirectional.

== Extraneous solutions: multiplication ==
One of the basic principles of algebra is that one can multiply both sides of an equation by the same expression without changing the equation's solutions. However, strictly speaking, this is not true, in that multiplication by certain expressions may introduce new solutions that were not present before. For example, consider the following equation:

$$x+2=0.$$

If we multiply both sides by zero, we get,

$$0=0.$$

This is true for all values of $x$, so the solution set is all real numbers. But clearly not all real numbers are solutions to the original equation. The problem is that multiplication by zero is not invertible: if we multiply by any nonzero value, we can reverse the step by dividing by the same value, but division by zero is not defined, so multiplication by zero cannot be reversed.

More subtly, suppose we take the same equation and multiply both sides by $x$. We get

$$x(x+2)=(0)x,$$
$$x^2+2x=0.$$

This quadratic equation has two solutions: $x=-2$ and $x=0.$ But if $0$ is substituted for $x$ in the original equation, the result is the invalid equation $2=0$. This counterintuitive result occurs because in the case where $x=0$, multiplying both sides by $x$ multiplies both sides by zero, and so necessarily produces a true equation just as in the first example.

In general, whenever we multiply both sides of an equation by an expression involving variables, we introduce extraneous solutions wherever that expression is equal to zero. But it is not sufficient to exclude these values, because they may have been legitimate solutions to the original equation. For example, suppose we multiply both sides of our original equation $x+2=0$ by $x+2.$ We get

$$(x+2)(x+2)=0(x+2),$$
$$x^2+4x+4=0,$$

which has only one real solution: $x=-2$. This is a solution to the original equation so cannot be excluded, even though $x+2=0$ for this value of $x$.

== Extraneous solutions: rational ==
Extraneous solutions can arise naturally in problems involving fractions with variables in the denominator. For example, consider this equation:

$$\frac{1}{x - 2} = \frac{3}{x + 2} - \frac{6x}{(x - 2)(x + 2)}\,.$$

To begin solving, we multiply each side of the equation by the least common denominator of all the fractions contained in the equation. In this case, the least common denominator is $(x - 2)(x + 2)$. After performing these operations, the fractions are eliminated, and the equation becomes:

$$x + 2 = 3(x - 2) - 6x\,.$$

Solving this yields the single solution $x=-2.$ However, when we substitute the solution back into the original equation, we obtain:

$$\frac{1}{-2 - 2} = \frac{3}{-2 + 2} - \frac{6(-2)}{(-2 - 2)(-2 + 2)}\,.$$

The equation then becomes:

$$\frac{1}{-4} = \frac{3}{0} + \frac{12}{0}\,.$$

This equation is not valid, since one cannot divide by zero. Therefore, the solution $x=-2$ is extraneous and not valid, and the original equation has no solution.

For this specific example, it could be recognized that (for the value $x=-2$), the operation of multiplying by $(x - 2)(x + 2)$ would be a multiplication by zero. However, it is not always simple to evaluate whether each operation already performed was allowed by the final answer. Because of this, often, the only simple effective way to deal with multiplication by expressions involving variables is to substitute each of the solutions obtained into the original equation and confirm that this yields a valid equation. After discarding solutions that yield an invalid equation, we will have the correct set of solutions. In some cases, as in the above example, all solutions may be discarded, in which case the original equation has no solution.

== Missing solutions: division ==
Extraneous solutions are not too difficult to deal with because they just require checking all solutions for validity. However, more insidious are missing solutions, which can occur when performing operations on expressions that are invalid for certain values of those expressions.

For example, if we were solving the following equation, the correct solution is obtained by subtracting $4$ from both sides, then dividing both sides by $2$:

$$2x+4=0,$$
$$2x=-4,$$
$$x=-2.$$

By analogy, we might suppose we can solve the following equation by subtracting $2x$ from both sides, then dividing by $x$:

$$x^2+2x=0,$$
$$x^2=-2x,$$
$$x=-2.$$

The solution $x=-2$ is in fact a valid solution to the original equation; but the other solution, $x=0$, has disappeared. The problem is that we divided both sides by $x$, which involves the indeterminate operation of dividing by zero when $x=0.$

It is generally possible (and advisable) to avoid dividing by any expression that can be zero; however, where this is necessary, it is sufficient to ensure that any values of the variables that make it zero also fail to satisfy the original equation. For example, suppose we have this equation:

$$x+2=0.$$

It is valid to divide both sides by $x-2$, obtaining the following equation:

$$\frac{x+2}{x-2}=0.$$

This is valid because the only value of $x$ that makes $x-2$ equal to zero is $x=2,$ which is not a solution to the original equation.

In some cases we are not interested in certain solutions; for example, we may only want solutions where $x$ is positive. In this case it is acceptable to divide by an expression that is only zero when $x$ is zero or negative, because this can only remove solutions we do not care about.

== Other operations ==
Multiplication and division are not the only operations that can modify the solution set. For example, take the problem:

$$x^2 = 4.$$

If we take the positive square root of both sides, we get:

$$x = 2.$$

We are not taking the square root of any negative values here, since both $x^2$ and $4$ are necessarily positive. But we have lost the solution $x=-2.$ The reason is that $x$ is actually not in general the positive square root of $x^2.$ If $x$ is negative, the positive square root of $x^2$ is $-x.$ If the step is taken correctly, it leads instead to the equation:

$$\sqrt{x^2} = \sqrt{4}.$$
$$|x| = 2.$$
$$x = \pm 2.$$

This equation has the same two solutions as the original one: $x=2$ and $x=-2.$

We can also modify the solution set by squaring both sides, because this will make any negative values in the ranges of the equation positive, causing extraneous solutions.

== See also ==
- Invalid proof
