= Algebraic fraction =

Sort of mathematical expression

In algebra, an algebraic fraction is a fraction whose numerator and denominator are algebraic expressions. Two examples of algebraic fractions are $\frac{3x}{x^2+2x-3}$ and $\frac{\sqrt{x+2}}{x^2-3}$. Algebraic fractions are subject to the same laws as arithmetic fractions.

A rational fraction is an algebraic fraction whose numerator and denominator are both polynomials. Thus $\frac{3x}{x^2+2x-3}$ is a rational fraction, but not $\frac{\sqrt{x+2}}{x^2-3},$ because the numerator contains a square root function.

== Terminology ==
In the algebraic fraction $\tfrac{a}{b}$, the dividend a is called the numerator and the divisor b is called the denominator. The numerator and denominator are called the terms of the algebraic fraction.

A complex fraction is a fraction whose numerator or denominator, or both, contains a fraction. A simple fraction contains no fraction either in its numerator or its denominator. A fraction is in lowest terms if the only factor common to the numerator and the denominator is 1.

An expression which is not in fractional form is an integral expression. An integral expression can always be written in fractional form by giving it the denominator 1. A mixed expression is the algebraic sum of one or more integral expressions and one or more fractional terms.

== Rational fractions ==
If the expressions a and b are polynomials, the algebraic fraction is called a rational algebraic fraction or simply rational fraction. Rational fractions are also known as rational expressions. A rational fraction $\tfrac{f(x)}{g(x)}$ is called proper if $\deg f(x) < \deg g(x)$, and improper otherwise. For example, the rational fraction $\tfrac{2x}{x^2-1}$ is proper, and the rational fractions $\tfrac{x^3+x^2+1}{x^2-5x+6}$ and $\tfrac{x^2-x+1}{5x^2+3}$ are improper. Any improper rational fraction can be expressed as the sum of a polynomial (possibly constant) and a proper rational fraction. In the first example of an improper fraction one has

$$\frac{x^3+x^2+1}{x^2-5x+6} = (x+6) + \frac{24x-35}{x^2-5x+6},$$

where the second term is a proper rational fraction. The sum of two proper rational fractions is a proper rational fraction as well. The reverse process of expressing a proper rational fraction as the sum of two or more fractions is called resolving it into partial fractions. For example,

$$\frac{2x}{x^2-1} = \frac{1}{x-1} + \frac{1}{x+1}.$$

Here, the two terms on the right are called partial fractions.

== Irrational fractions ==
An irrational fraction is one that contains the variable under a fractional exponent. An example of an irrational fraction is

$$\frac{x^{1/2} - \tfrac13 a}{x^{1/3} - x^{1/2}}.$$

The process of transforming an irrational fraction to a rational fraction is known as rationalization. Every irrational fraction in which the radicals are monomials may be rationalized by finding the least common multiple of the indices of the roots, and substituting the variable for another variable with the least common multiple as exponent. In the example given, the least common multiple is 6, hence we can substitute $x = z^6$ to obtain

$$\frac{z^3 - \tfrac13 a}{z^2 - z^3}.$$

== See also ==
- Partial fraction decomposition
