= Euler's formula =

Complex exponential in terms of sine and cosine

Euler's formula is a mathematical formula in complex analysis that establishes the fundamental relationship between the trigonometric functions and the complex exponential function. It is named after Leonhard Euler, who mentioned the formula in his influential 1748 treatise Introductio in analysin infinitorum. Euler's formula states that, for any real number x, one has
$$e^{i x} = \cos x + i \sin x,$$
where e is the base of the natural logarithm, i is the imaginary unit, and cos and sin are the trigonometric functions cosine and sine respectively. This complex exponential function is sometimes denoted cis x ("cosine plus i sine"). The formula is still valid if x is a complex number, and is also called Euler's formula in this more general case.

Euler's formula is ubiquitous in mathematics, physics, chemistry, and engineering. The physicist Richard Feynman called the equation "our jewel" and "the most remarkable formula in mathematics".

When x = π, Euler's formula may be rewritten as e^{iπ} = −1 or e^{iπ} + 1 = 0, which is known as Euler's identity.

== History ==
In 1714, the English mathematician Roger Cotes presented a geometrical argument that can be interpreted (after correcting a misplaced factor of $\sqrt{-1}$) as:
$$ix = \ln(\cos x + i\sin x).$$
Exponentiating this equation yields Euler's formula.

The logarithmic statement is not universally correct for complex numbers, since a complex logarithm can have infinitely many values, differing by multiples of 2πi.

Euler's formula as a helix formed by the cosine and sine of various values of $\theta$. One curve represents the real component ( $\cos\theta$ ) and another, rotated 90 degrees around the z-axis due to multiplication by $i$, the imaginary component ( $\sin\theta$ )

Around 1740 Leonhard Euler turned his attention to the exponential function and derived the equation named after him by comparing the series expansions of the exponential and trigonometric expressions. The formula was first published in 1748 in his foundational work Introductio in analysin infinitorum.

Johann Bernoulli had found that
$$\frac{1}{1 + x^2} = \frac 1 2 \left( \frac{1}{1 - ix} + \frac{1}{1 + ix}\right).$$

And since
$$\int \frac{dx}{1 + ax} = \frac{1}{a} \ln(1 + ax) + C,$$
the above equation tells us something about complex logarithms by relating natural logarithms to imaginary (complex) numbers. Bernoulli, however, did not evaluate the integral.

Bernoulli's correspondence with Euler (who also knew the above equation) shows that Bernoulli did not fully understand complex logarithms. Euler also suggested that complex logarithms can have infinitely many values.

The view of complex numbers as points in the complex plane was described about 50 years later by Caspar Wessel.

== Definitions of complex exponentiation ==
The exponential function e^{x} for real values of x may be defined in a few different equivalent ways (see Characterizations of the exponential function). Several of these methods may be directly extended to give definitions of e^{z} for complex values of z simply by substituting z in place of x and using the complex algebraic operations. In particular, we may use any of the three following definitions, which are equivalent. From a more advanced perspective, each of these definitions may be interpreted as giving the unique analytic continuation of e^{x} to the complex plane.

=== Differential equation definition ===
The exponential function $f(z) = e^z$ is the unique differentiable function of a complex variable for which the derivative equals the function
$$\frac{df}{dz} = f$$
and
$$f(0) = 1.$$

=== Power series definition ===
For complex z
$$e^z = 1 + \frac{z}{1!} + \frac{z^2}{2!} + \frac{z^3}{3!} + \cdots = \sum_{n=0}^{\infty} \frac{z^n}{n!}.$$

Using the ratio test, it is possible to show that this power series has an infinite radius of convergence and so defines e^{z} for all complex z.

=== Limit definition ===
For complex z
$$e^z = \lim_{n \to \infty} \left(1+\frac{z}{n}\right)^n.$$

Here, n is restricted to positive integers, so there is no question about what the power with exponent n means.

== Proofs ==
Various proofs of the formula are possible.

=== Using differentiation ===
This proof shows that the quotient of the trigonometric and exponential expressions is the constant function of one, so they must be equal (the exponential function is never zero, so this is permitted).

Consider the function f(θ)
$$f(\theta) = \frac{\cos\theta + i\sin\theta}{e^{i\theta}} = e^{-i\theta} \left(\cos\theta + i \sin\theta\right)$$
for real θ. Differentiating gives by the product rule
$$f'(\theta) = e^{-i\theta} \left(i\cos\theta - \sin\theta\right) - ie^{-i\theta} \left(\cos\theta + i\sin\theta\right) = 0$$
Thus, f(θ) is a constant. Since the exponential function is 1 for θ = 0, by definition, and the complex trig function also evaluates to 1 there, f(0) = 1/1 = 1, then f(θ) = 1 for all real θ, and thus
$$e^{i\theta} = \cos\theta + i\sin\theta.$$

=== Using power series ===
A plot of the first few terms of the Taylor series of e^{it} for t = 2.

Here is a proof of Euler's formula using power-series expansions, as well as basic facts about the powers of i:
$$\begin{align}
i^0 &= 1, & i^1 &= i, & i^2 &= -1, & i^3 &= -i, \\
i^4 &= 1, & i^5 &= i, & i^6 &= -1, & i^7 &= -i \\
&\vdots   & &\vdots   & &\vdots    & &\vdots
\end{align}$$

Using now the power-series definition from above, we see that for real values of x
$$\begin{align}
e^{ix} &= 1 + ix + \frac{(ix)^2}{2!} + \frac{(ix)^3}{3!} + \frac{(ix)^4}{4!} + \frac{(ix)^5}{5!} + \frac{(ix)^6}{6!} + \frac{(ix)^7}{7!} + \frac{(ix)^8}{8!} + \cdots \\[8pt]
&= 1 + ix - \frac{x^2}{2!} - \frac{ix^3}{3!} + \frac{x^4}{4!} + \frac{ix^5}{5!} - \frac{x^6}{6!} - \frac{ix^7}{7!} + \frac{x^8}{8!} + \cdots \\[8pt]
&= \left( 1 - \frac{x^2}{2!} + \frac{x^4}{4!} - \frac{x^6}{6!} + \frac{x^8}{8!} - \cdots \right) + i\left( x - \frac{x^3}{3!} + \frac{x^5}{5!} - \frac{x^7}{7!} + \cdots \right) \\[8pt]
&= \cos x + i\sin x ,
\end{align}$$
where in the last step we recognize the two terms are the Maclaurin series for cos x and sin x. The splitting into two series is justified since we know the series for sine and cosine converge.

=== Using polar coordinates ===
Another proof is based on the fact that all complex numbers can be expressed in polar coordinates and on the assumption that $e^{ix}$ can be likewise represented; this will be the case if we find a solution. Therefore, for some r and θ depending on x,
$$e^{i x} = r \left(\cos \theta + i \sin \theta\right).$$
No assumptions are being made about r and θ; they will be determined in the course of the proof. From any of the definitions of the exponential function it can be shown that the derivative of e^{ix} is ie^{ix}. Therefore, differentiating both sides gives
$$i e ^{ix} = \left(\cos \theta  + i \sin \theta\right) \frac{dr}{dx} + r \left(-\sin \theta + i \cos \theta\right) \frac{d\theta}{dx}.$$
Substituting r(cos θ + i sin θ) for e^{ix} and equating real and imaginary parts in this formula gives dr/dx = 0 and dθ/dx = 1. Thus, r is a constant, and θ is x + C for some constant C. We now have
$$e^{i\theta}=r e^{iC}(\cos \theta +i  \sin \theta);$$
knowing that e^{i0} = 1, for θ = 0, this becomes
$$1=r e^{iC}(\cos(0)+i\sin(0))=r e^{iC}(1+i0)=r e^{iC},$$
giving us the constant $r e^{iC}=1$ and proving the formula
$$e^{i \theta} = \cos \theta + i  \sin \theta.$$

== Applications ==
=== Applications in complex number theory ===
Euler's formula e^{iφ} = cos φ + i sin φ illustrated in the complex plane.

==== Interpretation of the formula ====
This formula can be interpreted as saying that the function e^{iφ} is a unit complex number, i.e., it traces out the unit circle in the complex plane as φ ranges through the real numbers. Here φ is the angle that a line connecting the origin with a point on the unit circle makes with the positive real axis, measured counterclockwise and in radians.

The original proof is based on the Taylor series expansions of the exponential function e^{z} (where z is a complex number) and of sin x and cos x for real numbers x (see above). In fact, the same proof shows that Euler's formula is even valid for all complex numbers x.

A point in the complex plane can be represented by a complex number written in cartesian coordinates. Euler's formula provides a means of conversion between cartesian coordinates and polar coordinates. The polar form simplifies the mathematics when used in multiplication or powers of complex numbers. Any complex number z = x + iy, and its complex conjugate, z̅ = x − iy, can be written as
$$\begin{align}
z &= x + iy = |z| (\cos \varphi + i\sin \varphi) = r e^{i \varphi}, \\
\bar{z} &= x - iy = |z| (\cos \varphi - i\sin \varphi) = r e^{-i \varphi},
\end{align}$$
where

- x = Re z is the real part,
- y = Im z is the imaginary part,
- $\textstyle r = |z| = \sqrt{x^2 + y^2}$ is the magnitude of z and
- φ = arg z = atan2(y, x).

φ is the argument of z, i.e., the angle between the x axis and the vector z measured counterclockwise in radians, which is defined up to addition of 2π. Many texts write φ = tan^{−1} y/x instead of φ = atan2(y, x), but the first equation needs adjustment when x ≤ 0. This is because for any real x and y, not both zero, the angles of the vectors (x, y) and (−x, −y) differ by π radians, but have the identical value of tan φ = y/x.

==== Use of the formula to define the logarithm of complex numbers ====
Now, taking this derived formula, we can use Euler's formula to define the logarithm of a complex number. To do this, we also use the definition of the logarithm (as the inverse operator of exponentiation):
$$a = e^{\ln a},$$
and that
$$e^a e^b = e^{a + b},$$
both valid for any complex numbers a and b. Therefore, one can write:
$$z = \left|z\right| e^{i \varphi} = e^{\ln\left|z\right|} e^{i \varphi} = e^{\ln\left|z\right| + i \varphi}$$
for any z ≠ 0. Taking the logarithm of both sides shows that
$$\ln z = \ln \left|z\right| + i \varphi,$$
and in fact, this can be used as the definition for the complex logarithm. The logarithm of a complex number is thus a multi-valued function, because φ is multi-valued.

Finally, the other exponential law
$$\left(e^a\right)^k = e^{a k},$$
which can be seen to hold for all integers k, together with Euler's formula, implies several trigonometric identities, as well as de Moivre's formula.

==== Relationship to trigonometry ====
Relationship between sine, cosine and exponential function

Euler's formula, the definitions of the trigonometric functions and the standard identities for exponentials are sufficient to easily derive most trigonometric identities. It provides a powerful connection between analysis and trigonometry, and provides an interpretation of the sine and cosine functions as weighted sums of the exponential function:
$$\begin{align}
\cos x &= \operatorname{Re} \left(e^{ix}\right) =\frac{e^{ix} + e^{-ix}}{2}, \\
\sin x &= \operatorname{Im} \left(e^{ix}\right) =\frac{e^{ix} - e^{-ix}}{2i}.
\end{align}$$

The two equations above can be derived by adding or subtracting Euler's formulas:
$$\begin{align}
e^{ix}  &= \cos x + i \sin x, \\
e^{-ix} &= \cos(- x) + i \sin(- x) = \cos x - i \sin x
\end{align}$$
and solving for either cosine or sine.

These formulas can even serve as the definition of the trigonometric functions for complex arguments x. For example, letting x = iy, we have:
$$\begin{align}
\cos iy &= \frac{e^{-y} + e^y}{2} = \cosh y, \\
\sin iy &= \frac{e^{-y} - e^y}{2i} = \frac{e^y - e^{-y}}{2}i = i\sinh y.
\end{align}$$

In addition
$$\begin{align}
\cosh ix &= \frac{e^{ix} + e^{-ix}}{2} = \cos x, \\
\sinh ix &= \frac{e^{ix} - e^{-ix}}{2} = i\sin x.
\end{align}$$

Complex exponentials can simplify trigonometry, because they are mathematically easier to manipulate than their sine and cosine components. One technique is simply to convert sines and cosines into equivalent expressions in terms of exponentials sometimes called complex sinusoids. After the manipulations, the simplified result is still real-valued. For example:

$$\begin{align}
\cos x \cos y &= \frac{e^{ix}+e^{-ix}}{2} \cdot \frac{e^{iy}+e^{-iy}}{2} \\
&= \frac 1 2 \cdot \frac{e^{i(x+y)}+e^{i(x-y)}+e^{i(-x+y)}+e^{i(-x-y)}}{2} \\
&= \frac 1 2 \bigg( \frac{e^{i(x+y)} + e^{-i(x+y)}}{2} + \frac{e^{i(x-y)} + e^{-i(x-y)}}{2} \bigg)\\
&= \frac 1 2 \left( \cos(x+y) + \cos(x-y) \right).
\end{align}$$

Another technique is to represent sines and cosines in terms of the real part of a complex expression and perform the manipulations on the complex expression. For example:
$$\begin{align}
\cos nx &= \operatorname{Re} \left(e^{inx}\right) \\
&= \operatorname{Re} \left( e^{i(n-1)x}\cdot e^{ix} \right) \\
&= \operatorname{Re} \Big( e^{i(n-1)x}\cdot \big(\underbrace{e^{ix} + e^{-ix}}_{2\cos x } - e^{-ix}\big) \Big) \\
&= \operatorname{Re} \left( e^{i(n-1)x}\cdot 2\cos x - e^{i(n-2)x} \right) \\
&= \cos[(n-1)x] \cdot [2 \cos x] - \cos[(n-2)x].
\end{align}$$

This formula is used for recursive generation of cos nx for integer values of n and arbitrary x (in radians).

Considering cos x a parameter in equation above yields recursive formula for Chebyshev polynomials of the first kind.

=== Topological interpretation ===
In the language of topology, Euler's formula states that the imaginary exponential function $t \mapsto e^{it}$ is a (surjective) morphism of topological groups from the real line $\mathbb R$ to the unit circle $\mathbb S^1$. In fact, this exhibits $\mathbb R$ as a covering space of $\mathbb S^1$. Similarly, Euler's identity says that the kernel of this map is $\tau \mathbb Z$, where $\tau = 2\pi$. These observations may be combined and summarized in the commutative diagram below:

Euler's formula and identity combined in diagrammatic form

=== Other applications ===
In differential equations, the function e^{ix} is often used to simplify solutions, even if the final answer is a real function involving sine and cosine. The reason for this is that the exponential function is the eigenfunction of the operation of differentiation.

In electrical engineering, signal processing, and similar fields, signals that vary periodically over time are often described as a combination of sinusoidal functions (see Fourier analysis), and these are more conveniently expressed as the sum of exponential functions with imaginary exponents, using Euler's formula. Also, phasor analysis of circuits can include Euler's formula to represent the impedance of a capacitor or an inductor.

In the four-dimensional space of quaternions, there is a sphere of imaginary units. For any point r on this sphere, and x a real number, Euler's formula applies:
$$\exp xr = \cos x + r \sin x,$$
and the element is called a versor in quaternions. The set of all versors forms a 3-sphere in the 4-space.

== See also ==
- History of Lorentz transformations
- Integration using Euler's formula
- List of topics named after Leonhard Euler
