= Argument (complex analysis) =

Angle of complex number about real axis

Figure 1. This Argand diagram represents the complex number lying on a plane. For each point on the plane, arg is the function which returns the angle $\varphi$.

In mathematics (particularly in complex analysis), the argument of a complex number z, denoted arg(z), is the angle between the positive real axis and the line joining the origin and z, represented as a point in the complex plane, shown as $\varphi$ in Figure 1. By convention the positive real axis is drawn pointing rightward, the positive imaginary axis is drawn pointing upward, and complex numbers with positive real part are considered to have an anticlockwise argument with positive sign.

When any real-valued angle is considered, the argument is a multivalued function operating on the nonzero complex numbers. The principal value of this function is single-valued, typically chosen to be the unique value of the argument that lies within the interval (−π, π]. In this article the multi-valued function will be denoted arg(z) and its principal value will be denoted Arg(z), but in some sources the capitalization of these symbols is exchanged.

== Definition ==
Figure 2. Two choices for the argument $\varphi$

An argument of the nonzero complex number z = x + iy, denoted arg(z), is defined in two equivalent ways:

1. Geometrically, in the complex plane, as the 2D polar angle $\varphi$ from the positive real axis to the vector representing z. The numeric value is given by the angle in radians, and is positive if measured counterclockwise.
2. Algebraically, as any real quantity $\varphi$ such that

$$z = r (\cos \varphi + i \sin \varphi) = r e^{i\varphi}$$

for some positive real r (see Euler's formula). The quantity r is the modulus (or absolute value) of z, denoted |z|:
$$r = \sqrt{x^2 + y^2}.$$

The argument of zero is usually left undefined. The names magnitude, for the modulus, and phase, for the argument, are sometimes used equivalently. In some older mathematical texts, the term "amplitude" was used interchangeably with argument to denote the angle of a complex number. (Note: For example, in Ahlfors (1979), where amplitude referred to the argument of a complex number.) While this term is largely outdated in modern texts, it still appears in some regional educational resources, where it is sometimes used in introductory-level textbooks.

Under both definitions, it can be seen that the argument of any non-zero complex number has many possible values: firstly, as a geometrical angle, it is clear that whole circle rotations do not change the point, so angles differing by an integer multiple of 2π radians (a complete turn) are the same, as reflected by figure 2 on the right. Similarly, from the periodicity of sin and cos, the second definition also has this property.

== Principal value ==
Figure 3. The principal value Arg of the blue point at 1 + i is π/4. The red line here is the branch cut.

Because a complete rotation around the origin leaves a complex number unchanged, there are many choices which could be made for $\varphi$ by circling the origin any number of times, as shown in figure 2.

When a well-defined function is required, then the usual choice, known as the principal value, is the value in the open-closed interval (−π, π] radians, that is from −π to π radians excluding −π radians itself (equiv., from −180 to +180 degrees, excluding −180° itself). This represents an angle of up to half a complete circle from the positive real axis in either direction.

Some authors define the range of the principal value as being in the closed–open interval [0, 2π).

=== Notation ===
The principal value sometimes has the initial letter capitalized, as in Arg z, especially when a general version of the argument is also being considered. Note that notation varies, so arg and Arg may be interchanged in different texts.

The set of all possible values of the argument can be written in terms of Arg as:
$$\arg(z) = \{\operatorname{Arg}(z) + 2\pi n \mid n \in \mathbb Z\}.$$

== Computing from the real and imaginary part ==
If a complex number is known in terms of its real and imaginary parts, then the function that calculates the principal value Arg is called the two-argument arctangent function, atan2:
$$\operatorname{Arg}(x + iy) = \operatorname{atan2}(y,\, x)$$
The atan2 function is available in the math libraries of many programming languages, sometimes under a different name, and usually returns a value in the range (−π, π]. See atan2 for further detail and alternative implementations, such as
$$\operatorname{atan2}(y, x) = 2 \operatorname{atan} \frac{y}{\sqrt{x^2+y^2} + x}\,,$$
which works except when $y=0$ and $x\le0$, in which case the value is instead π if $x<0$ or undefined when $x=0$.

== Realizations of the function in computer languages ==
=== Wolfram language (Mathematica) ===
In Wolfram language, there's Arg[z]:

Arg[x + y I]
$$=
\begin{cases}
0 &\text{if } x = 0 \text{ and } y = 0, \\[5mu]
\text{undefined} &\text{if } |x| = \infty \text{ and } |y|=\infty, \\[5mu]
0 &\text{if } x = \infty \text{ and } |y|\ne\infty, \\[5mu]
\pi &\text{if } x = -\infty \text{ and } |y|\ne\infty, \\[5mu]
\pm\frac{\pi}{2} &\text{if } y = \pm\infty \text{ and } |x|\ne\infty, \\[5mu]
\operatorname{Arg}(x + y i) &\text{otherwise}.
\end{cases}$$

or using the language's ArcTan:

Arg[x + y I]
$$=
\begin{cases}
0 &\text{if } x = 0 \text{ and } y = 0, \\[5mu]
\text{ArcTan[x, y]} &\text{otherwise}.
\end{cases}$$

ArcTan[x, y] is $\operatorname{atan2}(y, x)$ extended to work with infinities. ArcTan[0, 0] is Indeterminate (i.e. it is still defined), while ArcTan[Infinity, -Infinity] doesn't return anything (i.e. it is undefined).

=== Maple ===
Maple's argument(z) behaves the same as Arg[z] in Wolfram language, except that argument(z) also returns $-\pi$ if z is the special floating-point value −0.. Also, Maple doesn't have $\operatorname{atan2}$.

=== MATLAB ===
MATLAB's angle(z) behaves the same as Arg[z] in Wolfram language, except that it is

$$\begin{cases}
\frac{1\pi}{4} &\text{if } x = \infty \text{ and } y = \infty, \\[5mu]
-\frac{1\pi}{4} &\text{if } x = \infty \text{ and } y = -\infty, \\[5mu]
\frac{3\pi}{4} &\text{if } x = -\infty \text{ and } y = \infty, \\[5mu]
-\frac{3\pi}{4} &\text{if } x = -\infty \text{ and } y = -\infty.
\end{cases}$$

Unlike in Maple and Wolfram language, MATLAB's atan2(y, x) is equivalent to angle(x + y*1i). That is, atan2(0, 0) is $0$.

== Identities ==
One of the main motivations for defining the principal value Arg is to be able to write complex numbers in modulus-argument form. Hence for any complex number z,
$$z = \left| z \right| e^{i \operatorname{Arg} z}.$$

This is only really valid if z is non-zero, but can be considered valid for z = 0 if $\operatorname{Arg}0$ is considered as an indeterminate form—rather than as being undefined.

Some further identities follow. If z_{1} and z_{2} are two non-zero complex numbers, then
$$\begin{align}
\operatorname{Arg}(z_1  z_2) &\equiv \operatorname{Arg}z_1 + \operatorname{Arg}z_2 \pmod{\left(-\pi,\pi\right]}, \\
\operatorname{Arg}\frac{z_1}{z_2} &\equiv \operatorname{Arg}z_1 - \operatorname{Arg}z_2 \pmod{\left(-\pi,\pi\right]},
\end{align}$$
where $(\operatorname{mod}\left(-\pi,\pi\right])$ means to add or subtract any integer multiple of 2π if necessary to bring the value into the interval of (−π, π] radians. In particular,
$$\operatorname{Arg}(-z) \equiv \operatorname{Arg}z+\pi\begin{cases}1,&\operatorname{Im}z<0,\\\operatorname{sgn}z,&\operatorname{Im}z=0,\\-1,&\operatorname{Im}z>0.\\\end{cases}$$

If z ≠ 0 and n is any integer, then
$$\operatorname{Arg}\left(z^n\right) \equiv n \operatorname{Arg}z \pmod{\left(-\pi,\pi\right]}.$$

=== Example ===
$$\operatorname{Arg}\left(\frac{-1- i}i\right) = \left(\operatorname{Arg}(-1 - i) - \operatorname{Arg}i = -\frac{3\pi}4 - \frac\pi2 = -\frac{5\pi}4\right)\pmod{\left(-\pi,\pi\right]}=\frac{3\pi}4.$$

=== Using the complex logarithm ===
From $z = |z| e^{i \operatorname{Arg}z}$, we get $i \operatorname{Arg}z = \ln \frac{z}{|z|}$, alternatively $\operatorname{Arg}(z) = \operatorname{Im}\ln \frac{z}{|z|} = \operatorname{Im}\ln z$. As we are taking the imaginary part, any normalization by a positive real scalar will not affect the result. This is useful when one has the complex logarithm available.

=== Differentiation ===
The argument function is not complex differentiable, as the limit
$$\lim\limits_{z\to z_0}\frac{\arg z-\arg z_0}{z-z_0}$$
does not exist for any $z_0\in\mathbb{C}$ and on any branch (indeed, for any chosen branch the numerator takes the same value). However, the Wirtinger derivatives may be applied to it. Begin from the logarithmic identity
$$\ln z=\operatorname{Ln}|z|+i\arg z.$$
Use that $|z|^{2}=z\bar{z}$:
$$\ln z=\frac{1}{2}\operatorname{Ln} z +\frac{1}{2}\operatorname{Ln}\bar{z}+i\arg z.$$
Performing different branch cuts lets one apply the derivatives to all points of the principal logarithm in two goes. First, apply $\frac{\partial}{\partial z}$:
$$\frac{1}{z}=\frac{1}{2}\frac{1}{z}+0+i\frac{\partial}{\partial z}\arg z.$$
Rearranging gives $\frac{\partial}{\partial z}\arg z=\frac{-i}{2z}$. Now apply $\frac{\partial}{\partial\bar{z}}$:
$$0=0+\frac{1}{2}\frac{1}{\bar{z}}+i\frac{\partial}{\partial\bar{z}}\arg z.$$
This shows that $\frac{\partial}{\partial\bar{z}}\arg z=\frac{i}{2\bar{z}}$. As both Wirtinger derivatives exist, one can then apply the Dolbeault derivatives,
$$\partial\arg(z)=\frac{-i}{2z}\,dz,$$
$$\bar{\partial}\arg(z)=\frac{i}{2\bar{z}}\,d\bar{z}.$$
This then means the exterior derivative exists, given by their sum,
$$d\arg(z)=\frac{-i}{2z}\,dz+\frac{i}{2\bar{z}}\,d\bar{z}.$$
This is an important differential form, as it is precisely the generator of the first de Rham cohomology of the circle, $H^{1}_{dR}(S^{1})$. In other words,
$$d\arg(z)=\frac{-i}{2z}\,dz+\frac{i}{2\bar{z}}\,d\bar{z}=\frac{x\,dy-y\,dx}{x^{2}+y^{2}},$$
making this form closed but not exact in the usual sense (a byproduct of being multivalued):
$$\oint\limits_{S^1}d\arg(z)=2\pi>0$$
with the standard orientation.

== Bibliography ==
- Ahlfors, Lars (1979). Complex Analysis: An Introduction to the Theory of Analytic Functions of One Complex Variable (3rd ed.). New York, London: McGraw-Hill. ISBN 0-07-000657-1.
- Ponnuswamy, S. (2005). Foundations of Complex Analysis (2nd ed.). New Delhi, Mumbai: Narosa. ISBN 978-81-7319-629-4.
- Beardon, Alan (1979). Complex Analysis: The Argument Principle in Analysis and Topology. Chichester: Wiley. ISBN 0-471-99671-8.
- Borowski, Ephraim; Borwein, Jonathan (2002) [1st ed. 1989 as Dictionary of Mathematics]. Mathematics. Collins Dictionary (2nd ed.). Glasgow: HarperCollins. ISBN 0-00-710295-X.
