= Global analytic function =

In the mathematical field of complex analysis, a global analytic function (or complete analytic function) is a generalization of the notion of an analytic function which allows for functions to have multiple branches. Global analytic functions arise naturally in considering the possible analytic continuations of an analytic function, since analytic continuations may have a non-trivial monodromy. They are one foundation for the theory of Riemann surfaces.

The definition of a global analytic function goes back to Karl Weierstrass.

== Definition ==
The following definition may be found in Ahlfors (1979). An analytic function in an open set U is called a function element. Two function elements (f_{1}, U_{1}) and (f_{2}, U_{2}) are said to be analytic continuations of one another if U_{1} ∩ U_{2} ≠ ∅ and f_{1} = f_{2} on this intersection. A chain of analytic continuations is a finite sequence of function elements (f_{1}, U_{1}), …, (f_{n},U_{n}) such that each consecutive pair are analytic continuations of one another; i.e., (f_{i+1}, U_{i+1}) is an analytic continuation of (f_{i}, U_{i}) for i = 1, 2, …, n − 1.

A global analytic function is a family f of function elements such that, for any (f,U) and (g,V) belonging to f, there is a chain of analytic continuations in f beginning at (f,U) and finishing at (g,V).

A complete global analytic function is a global analytic function f which contains every analytic continuation of each of its elements.

=== Sheaf-theoretic definition ===
Using ideas from sheaf theory, the definition can be streamlined. In these terms, a complete global analytic function is a path-connected sheaf of germs of analytic functions which is maximal in the sense that it is not contained (as an etale space) within any other path connected sheaf of germs of analytic functions.
