= Multivalued function =

Generalized mathematical function

Multivalued function {1,2,3} → {a,b,c,d}.

In mathematics, a multivalued function, multiple-valued function, many-valued function, or multifunction, is a function that has two or more values in its range for at least one point in its domain. It is a set-valued function with additional properties depending on context; though some authors do not distinguish between set-valued functions and multifunctions.

A multivalued function of sets f : X → Y is a subset

$$\Gamma_f\ \subseteq \ X\times Y.$$

Write f(x) for the set of those y ∈ Y with (x,y) ∈ Γ_{f}. If f is an ordinary function, it is a multivalued function by taking its graph

$$\Gamma_f\ =\ \{(x,f(x))\ :\ x\in X\}.$$

They are called single-valued functions to distinguish them.

== Motivation ==
The term multivalued function originated in complex analysis, from analytic continuation. It often occurs that one knows the value of a complex analytic function $f(z)$ in some neighbourhood of a point $z=a$. This is the case for functions defined by the implicit function theorem or by a Taylor series around $z=a$. In such a situation, one may extend the domain of the single-valued function $f(z)$ along curves in the complex plane starting at $a$. In doing so, one finds that the value of the extended function at a point $z=b$ depends on the chosen curve from $a$ to $b$; since none of the new values is more natural than the others, all of them are incorporated into a multivalued function.

For example, let $f(z)=\sqrt{z}\,$ be the usual square root function on positive real numbers. One may extend its domain to a neighbourhood of $z=1$ in the complex plane, and then further along curves starting at $z=1$, so that the values along a given curve vary continuously from $\sqrt{1}=1$. Extending to negative real numbers, one gets two opposite values for the square root—for example ±i for −1—depending on whether the domain has been extended through the upper or the lower half of the complex plane. This phenomenon is very frequent, occurring for nth roots, logarithms, and inverse trigonometric functions.

To define a single-valued function from a complex multivalued function, one may distinguish one of the multiple values as the principal value, producing a single-valued function on the whole plane which is discontinuous along certain boundary curves. Alternatively, dealing with the multivalued function allows having something that is everywhere continuous, at the cost of possible value changes when one follows a closed path (monodromy). These problems are resolved in the theory of Riemann surfaces: to consider a multivalued function $f(z)$ as an ordinary function without discarding any values, one multiplies the domain into a many-layered covering space, a manifold which is the Riemann surface associated to $f(z)$.

== Inverses of functions ==
If f : X → Y is an ordinary function, then its inverse is the multivalued function

$$\Gamma_{f^{-1}}\ \subseteq \ Y\times X$$

defined as Γ_{f}, viewed as a subset of X × Y. When f is a differentiable function between manifolds, the inverse function theorem gives conditions for this to be single-valued locally in X.

For example, the complex logarithm log(z) is the multivalued inverse of the exponential function e^{z} : C → C^{×}, with graph

$$\Gamma_{\log(z)}\ =\ \{(z,w)\ :\ w=\log (z)\}\ \subseteq\ \mathbf{C}\times\mathbf{C}^\times.$$

It is not single valued, given a single w with w = log(z), we have

$$\log(z)\ =\ w\ +\ 2\pi i \mathbf{Z}.$$

Given any holomorphic function on an open subset of the complex plane C, its analytic continuation is always a multivalued function.

== Concrete examples ==
- Every real number greater than zero has two real square roots, so that square root may be considered a multivalued function. For example, we may write $\sqrt{4}=\pm 2=\{2,-2\}$; although zero has only one square root, $\sqrt{0} =\{0\}$. Note that $\sqrt{x}$ usually denotes only the principal square root of $x$.
- Each nonzero complex number has two square roots, three cube roots, and in general n nth roots. The only nth root of 0 is 0.
- The complex logarithm function is multiple-valued. The values assumed by $\log(a+bi)$ for real numbers $a$ and $b$ are $\log{\sqrt{a^2 + b^2}} + i\arg (a+bi) + 2 \pi n i$ for all integers $n$.
- Inverse trigonometric functions are multiple-valued because trigonometric functions are periodic. We have
  $$\tan\left(\tfrac{\pi}{4}\right) = \tan\left(\tfrac{5\pi}{4}\right)
= \tan\left({\tfrac{-3\pi}{4}}\right) = \tan\left({\tfrac{(4n+1)\pi}{4}}\right) = \cdots = 1.$$
  As a consequence, arctan(1) is intuitively related to several values: π/4, 5π/4, −3π/4, and so on. We can treat arctan as a single-valued function by restricting the domain of tan x to −π/2 < x < π/2 – a domain over which tan x is monotonically increasing. Thus, the range of arctan(x) becomes −π/2 < y < π/2. These values from a restricted domain are called principal values.
- The antiderivative can be considered as a multivalued function. The antiderivative of a function is the set of functions whose derivative is that function. The constant of integration follows from the fact that the derivative of a constant function is 0.
- Inverse hyperbolic functions over the complex domain are multiple-valued because hyperbolic functions are periodic along the imaginary axis. Over the reals, they are single-valued, except for arcosh and arsech.

These are all examples of multivalued functions that come about from non-injective functions. Since the original functions do not preserve all the information of their inputs, they are not reversible. Often, the restriction of a multivalued function is a partial inverse of the original function.

== Branch points ==
Multivalued functions of a complex variable have branch points. For example, for the nth root and logarithm functions, 0 is a branch point; for the arctangent function, the imaginary units i and −i are branch points. Using the branch points, these functions may be redefined to be single-valued functions, by restricting the range. A suitable interval may be found through use of a branch cut, a kind of curve that connects pairs of branch points, thus reducing the multilayered Riemann surface of the function to a single layer. As in the case with real functions, the restricted range may be called the principal branch of the function.

== Applications ==
In physics, multivalued functions play an increasingly important role. They form the mathematical basis for Dirac's magnetic monopoles, for the theory of defects in crystals and the resulting plasticity of materials, for vortices in superfluids and superconductors, and for phase transitions in these systems, for instance melting and quark confinement. They are the origin of gauge field structures in many branches of physics.

== See also ==
- Relation (mathematics)
- Function (mathematics)
- Binary relation
- Set-valued function
