= Liouvillian function =

Elementary functions and their finitely iterated integrals

In mathematics, the Liouvillian functions comprise a set of functions including the elementary functions and their repeated integrals. Liouvillian functions can be recursively defined as integrals of other Liouvillian functions.

More explicitly, a Liouvillian function is a function of one variable which is the composition of a finite number of algebraic operations ( addition, subtraction, multiplication, division, exponentiation, and root extraction) and antiderivatives. The logarithmic function does not need to be explicitly included since it is the integral of $1/x$.

It follows directly from the definition that the set of Liouvillian functions is closed under arithmetic operations, composition, and integration. It is also closed under differentiation. It is not closed under limits and infinite sums.

Liouvillian functions were introduced by Joseph Liouville in a series of papers from 1833 to 1841.

== Examples ==
All elementary functions are Liouvillian.

Examples of well-known functions which are Liouvillian but not elementary are the nonelementary antiderivatives, for example:

- The error function, $\mathrm{erf}(x)=\frac{2}{\sqrt{\pi}}\int_0^x e^{-t^2}\,dt,$
- The exponential (Ei), logarithmic (Li or li) and Fresnel (S and C) integrals.

All Liouvillian functions are solutions of algebraic differential equations, but not conversely. Examples of functions which are solutions of algebraic differential equations but not Liouvillian include:

- the Bessel functions (except special cases);
- the hypergeometric functions (except special cases).

Examples of functions which are not solutions of algebraic differential equations and thus not Liouvillian include all transcendentally transcendental functions, such as:

- the gamma function;
- the zeta function.

== See also ==
- Closed-form expression – Mathematical formula involving a given set of operations
- Differential Galois theory – Study of Galois symmetry groups of differential fields
- Liouville's theorem (differential algebra) – Says when antiderivatives of elementary functions can be expressed as elementary functions
- Nonelementary integral – Integrals not expressible in closed-form from elementary functions
- Picard–Vessiot theory – Study of differential field extensions induced by linear differential equations
