= Nonelementary integral =

Integrals not expressible in closed-form from elementary functions

In mathematics, a nonelementary antiderivative of a given elementary function is an antiderivative (or indefinite integral) that is, itself, not an elementary function. A theorem by Liouville in 1835 provided the first proof that nonelementary antiderivatives exist. This theorem also provides a basis for the Risch algorithm for determining (with difficulty) which elementary functions have elementary antiderivatives.

== Examples ==
Examples of functions with nonelementary antiderivatives include:

- $\sqrt{1 - x^4}$ (elliptic integral)
- $\frac{1}{\ln x}$ (logarithmic integral)
- $e^{-x^2}$ (error function, Gaussian integral)
- $\sin(x^2)$ and $\cos(x^2)$ (Fresnel integral)
- $\frac{\sin(x)}{x} = \operatorname{sinc}(x)$ (sine integral, Dirichlet integral)
- $\frac{e^{-x}}{x}$ (exponential integral)
- $e^{e^x} \,$(in terms of the exponential integral)
- $\ln(\ln x) \,$(in terms of the logarithmic integral)
- ${x^{c-1}}e^{-x}$ (incomplete gamma function); for $c = 0,$ the antiderivative can be written in terms of the exponential integral; for $c = \tfrac{1}{2},$ in terms of the error function; for $c =$ any positive integer, the antiderivative is elementary.

Some common non-elementary antiderivative functions are given names, defining so-called special functions, and formulas involving these new functions can express a larger class of non-elementary antiderivatives. The examples above name the corresponding special functions in parentheses.

== Properties ==
Nonelementary antiderivatives can often be evaluated using Taylor series. Even if a function has no elementary antiderivative, its Taylor series can always be integrated term-by-term like a polynomial, giving the antiderivative function as a Taylor series with the same radius of convergence. However, even if the integrand has a convergent Taylor series, its sequence of coefficients often has no elementary formula and must be evaluated term by term, with the same limitation for the integral Taylor series.

Even though it is not always possible to evaluate the antiderivative in elementary terms, one can approximate a corresponding definite integral by numerical integration. There are also cases where there is no elementary antiderivative, but specific definite integrals (often improper integrals over unbounded intervals) can be evaluated in elementary terms: most famously the Gaussian integral $\int_{-\infty}^{\infty} e^{-x^2} dx = \sqrt \pi.$

The closure under integration of the set of the elementary functions is the set of the Liouvillian functions.

== See also ==
- Algebraic function – Mathematical function
- Closed-form expression – Mathematical formula involving a given set of operations
- Derivative – Instantaneous rate of change (mathematics)
- Differential algebra – Algebraic study of differential equations
- Lists of integrals
- Liouville's theorem (differential algebra) – Criterion for integration in terms of elementary functions
- Richardson's theorem – Undecidability of equality of real numbers
- Symbolic integration – Computation of an antiderivatives
- Tarski's high school algebra problem – Mathematical problem
- Transcendental function – Analytic function that does not satisfy a polynomial equation
