= Risch (surname) =

Risch is a surname. Notable people with the surname include:

- Bernhard Risch (1879–1962), Liechtenstein politician
- Ferdinand Risch (1880–1940), Liechtenstein politician
- Martin Risch (1899–1970), President of the Landtag of Liechtenstein
- Rudolf Risch (1908–1944), German cyclist
- Ernst Risch (1911–1988), Swiss hellenist and philologist
- Joan Risch (born 1930), Massachusetts woman who disappeared from her home in 1961
- Jim Risch (born 1943), American politician
- Maurice Risch (born 1943), French actor
- Neil Risch, American geneticist
- Pierre Risch (born 1943), French artist
- Robert Henry Risch (born 1939), American mathematician
- Vicki Risch, First Lady of Idaho
- Patrick Risch (born 1968), Liechtenstein politician
- Daniel Risch (born 1978), Prime Minister of Liechtenstein

== See also ==
- Risch algorithm
- Risch-Rotkreuz, formerly Risch, a municipality in Switzerland
