= Closed-form expression =

Mathematical formula involving a given set of operations

In mathematics, a closed form expression or formula is one that is formed with constants, variables, and a set of functions considered as basic and connected by arithmetic operations (+, −, ×, /, and integer powers) and function composition. Commonly, the basic functions that are allowed in closed forms are nth root, exponential function, logarithm, and trigonometric functions. (Note: Hyperbolic functions, inverse trigonometric functions and inverse hyperbolic functions are also allowed, since they can be expressed in terms of the preceding ones.) However, the set of basic functions depends on the context. For example, if one adds polynomial roots to the basic functions, the functions that have a closed form are called elementary functions.

The closed-form problem arises when new ways are introduced for specifying mathematical objects, such as limits, series, and integrals: given an object specified with such tools, a natural problem is to find, if possible, a closed-form expression of this object; that is, an expression of this object in terms of previous ways of specifying it.

== Example: roots of polynomials ==
The quadratic formula

$$x=\frac{-b\pm\sqrt{b^2-4ac}}{2a}$$

is a closed form of the solutions to the general quadratic equation $ax^2+bx+c=0.$

More generally, in the context of polynomial equations, a closed form of a solution is a solution in radicals; that is, a closed-form expression for which the allowed functions are only nth-roots and field operations $(+, -, \times ,/).$ In fact, field theory allows showing that if a solution of a polynomial equation has a closed form involving exponentials, logarithms or trigonometric functions, then it has also a closed form that does not involve these functions.

There are expressions in radicals for all solutions of cubic equations (degree 3) and quartic equations (degree 4). The size of these expressions increases significantly with the degree, limiting their usefulness.

In higher degrees, the Abel–Ruffini theorem states that there are equations whose solutions cannot be expressed in radicals, and, thus, have no closed forms. A simple example is the equation $x^5-x-1=0.$ Galois theory provides an algorithmic method for deciding whether a particular polynomial equation can be solved in radicals.

== Symbolic integration ==
Symbolic integration consists essentially of the search of closed forms for antiderivatives of functions that are specified by closed-form expressions. In this context, the basic functions used for defining closed forms are commonly logarithms, exponential function and polynomial roots. Functions that have a closed form for these basic functions are called elementary functions and include trigonometric functions, inverse trigonometric functions, hyperbolic functions, and inverse hyperbolic functions.

The fundamental problem of symbolic integration is thus, given an elementary function specified by a closed-form expression, to decide whether its antiderivative is an elementary function, and, if it is, to find a closed-form expression for this antiderivative.

For rational functions; that is, for fractions of two polynomial functions; antiderivatives are not always rational fractions, but are always elementary functions that may involve logarithms and polynomial roots. This is usually proved with partial fraction decomposition. The need for logarithms and polynomial roots is illustrated by the formula

$$\int\frac{f(x)}{g(x)}\,dx=\sum_{\alpha \in \operatorname{Roots}(g(x))} \frac{f(\alpha)}{g'(\alpha)}\ln(x-\alpha),$$

which is valid if $f$ and $g$ are coprime polynomials such that $g$ is square free and $\deg f <\deg g.$

== Alternative definitions ==
Changing the basic functions to include additional functions can change the set of equations with closed-form solutions. Many cumulative distribution functions cannot be expressed in closed form, unless one considers special functions such as the error function or gamma function to be basic. It is possible to solve the quintic equation if general hypergeometric functions are included, although the solution is far too complicated algebraically to be useful. For many practical computer applications, it is entirely reasonable to assume that the gamma function and other special functions are basic since numerical implementations are widely available.

== Analytic expression ==
This is a term that is sometimes understood as a synonym for closed-form (see "Wolfram Mathworld".) but this usage is contested (see "Math Stackexchange".). It is unclear the extent to which this term is genuinely in use as opposed to the result of uncited earlier versions of this page.

== Comparison of different classes of expressions ==
The closed-form expressions do not include infinite series or continued fractions; neither includes integrals or limits. Indeed, by the Stone–Weierstrass theorem, any continuous function on the unit interval can be expressed as a limit of polynomials, so any class of functions containing the polynomials and closed under limits will necessarily include all continuous functions.

Similarly, an equation or system of equations is said to have a closed-form solution if and only if at least one solution can be expressed as a closed-form expression; and it is said to have an analytic solution if and only if at least one solution can be expressed as an analytic expression. There is a subtle distinction between a "closed-form function" and a "closed-form number" in the discussion of a "closed-form solution", discussed in (Chow 1999) and below. A closed-form or analytic solution is sometimes referred to as an explicit solution (in contrast to implicit equations).

	Arithmetic expressions	Polynomial expressions	Algebraic expressions	Closed-form expressions	Analytic expressions	Mathematical expressions
Constant	Yes	Yes	Yes	Yes	Yes	Yes
Elementary arithmetic operation	Yes	Addition, subtraction, and multiplication only	Yes	Yes	Yes	Yes
Finite sum	Yes	Yes	Yes	Yes	Yes	Yes
Finite product	Yes	Yes	Yes	Yes	Yes	Yes
Finite continued fraction	Yes	No	Yes	Yes	Yes	Yes
Variable	No	Yes	Yes	Yes	Yes	Yes
Integer exponent	No	Yes	Yes	Yes	Yes	Yes
Integer nth root	No	No	Yes	Yes	Yes	Yes
Rational exponent	No	No	Yes	Yes	Yes	Yes
Integer factorial	No	No	Yes	Yes	Yes	Yes
Irrational exponent	No	No	No	Yes	Yes	Yes
Exponential function	No	No	No	Yes	Yes	Yes
Logarithm	No	No	No	Yes	Yes	Yes
Trigonometric function	No	No	No	Yes	Yes	Yes
Inverse trigonometric function	No	No	No	Yes	Yes	Yes
Hyperbolic function	No	No	No	Yes	Yes	Yes
Inverse hyperbolic function	No	No	No	Yes	Yes	Yes
Root of a polynomial that is not an algebraic solution	No	No	No	No	Yes	Yes
Gamma function and factorial of a non-integer	No	No	No	No	Yes	Yes
Bessel function	No	No	No	No	Yes	Yes
Special function	No	No	No	No	Yes	Yes
Infinite sum (series) (including power series)	No	No	No	No	Convergent only	Yes
Infinite product	No	No	No	No	Convergent only	Yes
Infinite continued fraction	No	No	No	No	Convergent only	Yes
Limit	No	No	No	No	No	Yes
Derivative	No	No	No	No	No	Yes
Integral	No	No	No	No	No	Yes

== Dealing with non-closed-form expressions ==
=== Transformation into closed-form expressions ===
The expression:
$$f(x) = \sum_{n=0}^\infty \frac{x}{2^n}$$
is not in closed form because the summation entails an infinite number of elementary operations. However, by summing a geometric series this expression can be expressed in the closed form:
$$f(x) = 2x.$$

=== Differential Galois theory ===
The integral of a closed-form expression may or may not itself be expressible as a closed-form expression. This study is referred to as differential Galois theory, by analogy with algebraic Galois theory.

The basic theorem of differential Galois theory is due to Joseph Liouville in the 1830s and 1840s and hence referred to as Liouville's theorem.

A standard example of an elementary function whose antiderivative does not have a closed-form expression is:
$$e^{-x^2},$$
whose one antiderivative is (up to a multiplicative constant) the error function:
$$\operatorname{erf}(x) = \frac{2}{\sqrt{\pi}} \int_{0}^x e^{-t^2} \, dt.$$

=== Mathematical modelling and computer simulation ===
Equations or systems too complex for closed-form or analytic solutions can often be analysed by mathematical modelling and computer simulation (for an example in physics, see).

== Closed-form number ==
Three subfields of the complex numbers C have been suggested as encoding the notion of a "closed-form number"; in increasing order of generality, these are the Liouvillian numbers (not to be confused with Liouville numbers in the sense of rational approximation), EL numbers and elementary numbers. The Liouvillian numbers, denoted L, form the smallest algebraically closed subfield of C closed under exponentiation and logarithm (formally, intersection of all such subfields)—that is, numbers which involve explicit exponentiation and logarithms, but allow explicit and implicit polynomials (roots of polynomials); this is defined in (Ritt 1948, p. 60). L was originally referred to as elementary numbers, but this term is now used more broadly to refer to numbers defined explicitly or implicitly in terms of algebraic operations, exponentials, and logarithms. A narrower definition proposed in (Chow 1999, pp. 441–442), denoted E, and referred to as EL numbers, is the smallest subfield of C closed under exponentiation and logarithm—this need not be algebraically closed, and corresponds to explicit algebraic, exponential, and logarithmic operations. "EL" stands both for "exponential–logarithmic" and as an abbreviation for "elementary".

Whether a number is a closed-form number is related to whether a number is transcendental. Formally, Liouvillian numbers and elementary numbers contain the algebraic numbers, and they include some but not all transcendental numbers. In contrast, EL numbers do not contain all algebraic numbers, but do include some transcendental numbers. Closed-form numbers can be studied via transcendental number theory, in which a major result is the Gelfond–Schneider theorem, and a major open question is Schanuel's conjecture.

== Numerical computations ==
For purposes of numeric computations, being in closed form is not in general necessary, as many limits and integrals can be efficiently computed. Some equations have no closed form solution, such as those that represent the Three-body problem or the Hodgkin–Huxley model. Therefore, the future states of these systems must be computed numerically.

== Conversion from numerical forms ==
There is software that attempts to find closed-form expressions for numerical values, including RIES, identify in Maple and SymPy, Plouffe's Inverter, and the Inverse Symbolic Calculator.

== See also ==
- Algebraic solution – Solution in radicals of a polynomial equation
- Computer simulation – Process of mathematical modelling, performed on a computer
- Elementary function – Type of mathematical function
- Finitary operation – Addition, multiplication, division, ...
- Numerical solution – Methods for numerical approximations
- Liouvillian function – Elementary functions and their finitely iterated integrals
- Symbolic regression – Type of regression analysis
- Tarski's high school algebra problem – Mathematical problem
- Term (logic) – Components of a mathematical or logical formula
- Tupper's self-referential formula – Formula that visually represents itself when graphed
