= Robert Henry Risch =

American mathematician

- Born: 1939 (age 86–87)
- Education: University of California, Berkeley
- Known for: Risch algorithm
- Scientific career
- Thesis: The Problem of Integration in Finite Terms (1968)
- Doctoral advisor: Maxwell Rosenlicht

Robert Henry Risch (born 1939) is an American mathematician who worked on computer algebra and is known for his work on symbolic integration, specifically the Risch algorithm. This result was cited as a milestone in the development of mathematics:

Calculus students worldwide depend on the algorithm, whenever they appeal to Wolfram Alpha to do their homework.

He is also known for results on algebraic properties of elementary functions. He received his PhD from the University of California, Berkeley in 1968 under the supervision of Maxwell A. Rosenlicht. After his PhD, he worked at the Thomas J. Watson Research Center Mathematics of AI group and, between 1970 and 1972, the Institute for Advanced Study.
