= Elementary number =

Field extension of rational numbers

An elementary number is one formalization of the concept of a closed-form number. Roughly speaking, it is a complex number that can be specified using algebraic operations, exponentiation, and logarithms.

Several different kinds of elementary numbers appear in the literature.

An elementary number of Joseph Fels Ritt is built from an integer by applying finitely many $\Q$-algebraic operations (i.e. $\Q$-algebraic functions), exponential functions, and/or logarithm functions. The set of these numbers is the smallest subfield of $\C$ that is algebraically closed and closed under $\exp$ and $\ln$. An elementary number is a constant $\Q$-elementary function.

An exponential-logarithmic number of Timothy Y. Chow is built from an integer by applying finitely many field operations (i.e. rational functions) over $\Q$, exponential functions, and/or logarithm functions. The set of these numbers is the intersection of all subfields of $\C$ that are closed under exp and ln. It is closed under the field operations, $\exp$ and $\ln$.

An elementary number of Daniel Richardson is a solution of a special kind of system of exponential polynomial equations.

Chow's numbers can be presented explicitly, i.e. by applying rational, exponential and logarithmic functions, whereas Ritt's and Richardson's sets also allow implicit presentation, i.e. solutions of $\Q$-algebraic equations respectively special exponential-logarithmic polynomial systems.
