= Michael Singer =

Michael Singer may refer to:

- Michael Alan Singer, spirituality writer and former CEO of WebMD
- Michael F. Singer (born 1950), American mathematician
- Mike Singer, German pop singer and songwriter
- Michael Singer (artist) (1945-2024), American sculptor and designer

== See also ==
- Michael Signer, American author and lawyer
