= Integral logarithm =

The term integral logarithm may stand for:

- Discrete logarithm in algebra,
- Logarithmic integral function in calculus.
