= Maxwell Rosenlicht =

American mathematician

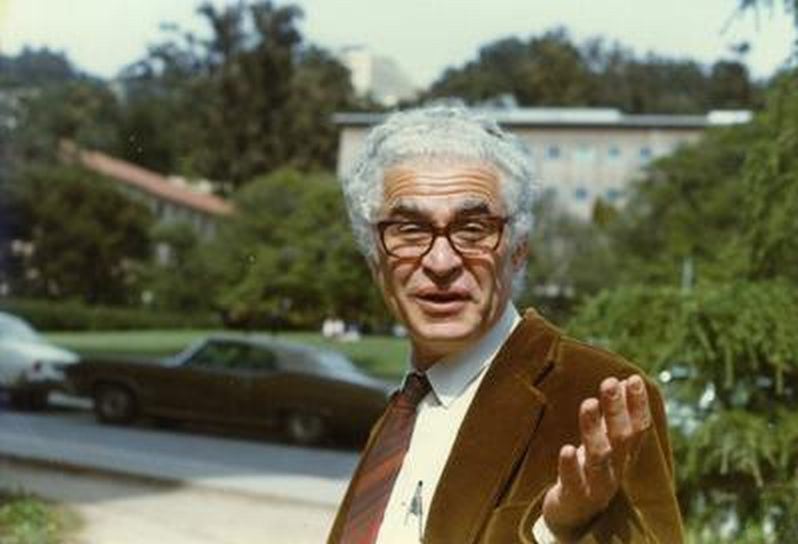
- Born: April 15, 1924; Brooklyn
- Died: January 22, 1999 (aged 74); Hawaii
- Education: Harvard University
- Awards: Cole Prize (1960)
- Scientific career
- Fields: Mathematics
- Workplaces: University of California, Berkeley; Northwestern University
- Doctoral advisor: Oscar Zariski
- Doctoral students: Michael F. Singer; Robert Henry Risch

Maxwell Alexander Rosenlicht (April 15, 1924 – January 22, 1999) was an American mathematician known for works in algebraic geometry, algebraic groups, and differential algebra.

Rosenlicht attended high school in Brooklyn (Erasmus High School) and studied at Columbia University (B.A. 1947) and at Harvard University, where he worked under Zariski. He was a Putnam fellow twice, in 1946 and 1947. He was awarded his doctorate on algebraic curve equivalence concepts in 1950. In 1952, he moved to Northwestern University. From 1958 until his retirement in 1991, he was a professor at the University of California, Berkeley. He was also a visiting professor in Mexico City, IHÉS, Rome, Leiden, and at Harvard University.

In 1960, he shared the Cole Prize in algebra with Serge Lang for his work on generalized Jacobian varieties. He also studied the algorithmic algebraic theory of integration.

Rosenlicht was a Fulbright Fellow and 1954 Guggenheim Fellow.

He died of neurological disease on a trip to Hawaii. Rosenlicht married in 1954 and had four children.

== Publications ==
- Rosenlicht, Maxwell (1968). "Liouville's Theorem on Functions with Elementary integral". Pacific Journal of Mathematics. 24 (1): 153–161. doi:10.2140/pjm.1968.24.153.
- Introduction to Analysis. Glenview: Scott, Foresman. 1968. ISBN 9780486650388.
- Rosenlicht, Maxwell (1972). "Integration in Finite Terms". American Mathematical Monthly. 79 (9): 963–972. doi:10.2307/2318066. JSTOR 2318066.
