= Implicit differentiation =

Mathematical operation in calculus

In calculus, implicit differentiation is a method for finding the derivative of a function that is defined by an equation rather than by an explicit formula. If an equation such as
$$F(x,y)=0$$
defines $y$ as a function of $x$, at least locally, implicit differentiation treats $y$ as a function $y(x)$ and differentiates both sides of the equation with respect to $x$. The method is an application of the chain rule.

Implicit differentiation is useful when solving explicitly for one variable is inconvenient, produces several branches, or is not possible in elementary terms. For example, the circle $x^2+y^2=1$ cannot be represented globally as the graph of a single function $y=f(x)$, but its upper and lower arcs can each be differentiated implicitly.

The method allows for the computation of the tangent line approximation to $y(x)$, given only the function $F$ and the point $(x_0,y_0)$ at which the approximation is made, so that no other knowledge of the functional dependence of $y$ on $x$ is needed. Tangent approximations to surfaces and higher-dimensional manifolds given by an equation or system of equations can be found by similar methods.

== Basic formula ==
Let $F$ be a differentiable function of two variables, and suppose that an equation

$$F(x,y)=F(x_0,y_0)$$

defines $y$ locally as a differentiable function of $x$, near the point $(x,y)=(x_0,y_0)$. Applying the differential to both sides gives
$$dF = 0$$
on the curve of interest, and writing the left-hand side in terms of the partial derivatives of $F$:
$$F_x(x,y)dx + F_y(x,y)dy = 0.$$
Therefore, evaluating at the point $(x_0,y_0)$ gives
$$\frac{dy}{dx} = - \frac{F_x(x_0,y_0)}{F_y(x_0,y_0)}$$
provided $F_y(x_0,y_0)\not=0$.

The derivative on the left-hand side of the formula can be interpreted as the slope of the tangent line to the curve defined implicitly by the equation $F(x,y)=F(x_0,y_0)$ through the given point $(x_0,y_0)$. The formula is local, in the sense that it gives only the derivative of the branch of the implicit function $y(x)$ whose graph contains the point $(x_0,y_0)$.

== Relation with the implicit function theorem ==
Intuitively, in order to be valid at a point $(x_0,y_0)$ implicit differentiation in the basic formulation requires that the function $F$ must genuinely depend on $y$ near the point $(x_0,y_0)$, for otherwise the equation $F(x,y)=F(x_0,y_0)$ cannot be solved for $y$ as a function of $x$ at all.

More is actually required: it is clear from the formula that the partial derivative $F_y(x_0,y_0)$ must be non-zero, because it appears in the denominator of the right-hand side of the formula for $dy/dx_{(x_0,y_0)}$. While this fact allows one to compute a numerical value, it is not obvious that the numerical value has the advertised meaning: namely, that it be the derivative of a function $y(x)$ whose graph is contained on the curve $F(x,y)=0$ through the point.

The implicit function theorem supplies the missing justification. It asserts as follows: suppose that $F(x,y)$ is a function such that both partial derivatives exist in a disc around $(x,y)=(x_0,y_0)$, and are continuous throughout the disc. Then if $F_y(x_0,y_0) \ne 0$, there is a differentiable function $y(x)$ defined in an open interval containing $x=x_0$, such that $F(x,y(x))=0$ throughout the interval, and whose derivative is given by the implicit differentiation formula at $(x_0,y_0)$. The function is, moreover, unique on a sufficiently small interval around $x_0$.

== Examples ==
=== Example 1 ===
Consider

$$y + x + 5 = 0 \,.$$

This equation is easy to solve for y, giving

$$y = -x - 5 \,,$$

where the right side is the explicit form of the function y(x). Differentiation then gives dy/dx = −1.

Alternatively, one can differentiate the original equation:

$$\begin{align}
\frac{dy}{dx} + \frac{dx}{dx} + \frac{d}{dx}(5) &= 0 \, ; \\[6px]
\frac{dy}{dx} + 1 + 0 &= 0 \,.
\end{align}$$

Solving for dy/dx gives

$$\frac{dy}{dx} = -1 \,,$$

the same answer as obtained previously.

=== Example 2 ===
An example of an implicit function for which implicit differentiation is easier than using explicit differentiation is the function y(x) defined by the equation

$$x^4 + 2y^2 = 8 \,.$$

To differentiate this explicitly with respect to x, one has first to get

$$y(x) = \pm\sqrt{\frac{8 - x^4}{2}} \,,$$

and then differentiate this function. This creates two derivatives: one for y ≥ 0 and another for y < 0.

It is substantially easier to implicitly differentiate the original equation:

$$4x^3 + 4y\frac{dy}{dx} = 0 \,,$$

giving

$$\frac{dy}{dx} = \frac{-4x^3}{4y} = -\frac{x^3}{y} \,.$$

=== Example 3 ===
Often, it is difficult or impossible to solve explicitly for y, and implicit differentiation is the only feasible method of differentiation. An example is the equation

$$y^5-y=x \,.$$

It is impossible to express y explicitly in radicals as a function of x, and therefore one cannot find dy/dx by explicit differentiation of elementary radical expressions. Using the implicit method, dy/dx can be obtained by differentiating the equation to obtain

$$5y^4\frac{dy}{dx} - \frac{dy}{dx} = \frac{dx}{dx} \,,$$

where dx/dx = 1. Factoring out dy/dx shows that

$$\left(5y^4 - 1\right)\frac{dy}{dx} = 1 \,,$$

which yields the result

$$\frac{dy}{dx}=\frac{1}{5y^4-1} \,,$$

which is defined for

$$y \ne \pm\frac{1}{\sqrt[4]{5}} \quad \text{and} \quad y \ne \pm \frac{i}{\sqrt[4]{5}} \,.$$

== Higher order derivatives ==
The method of implicit differentiation can be applied to find higher-order derivatives such as the second derivative of the implicitly-defined function $y(x)$ at the point of its graph $(x_0,y_0)$, provided the function $F$ is sufficiently smooth at the point.

For example, suppose that the first derivative of $y(x)$ has been found, by solving the equation
$$dF = F_x(x_0,y_0)\,dx + F_y(x_0,y_0)\,dy = 0$$
for $dy/dx$ at $(x_0,y_0)$.

Applying the second differential to $F(x,y) = F(x_0,y_0)$ then gives
$$d^2 F = 0$$
and expanding the left-hand side gives
$$d(F_x\,dx + F_y\,dy) = F_{xx}dx^2 + F_{yx}dx\,dy + F_{xy}dy\,dx + F_{yy}dy^2 + F_x\,d^2x + F_y\,d^2y=0.$$
where we have written the second partial derivatives of $F$ with repeated subscripts. Since it is the $x$ derivatives we are after, $d^2x=0$. Also, substituting the known expressions for $dy$ at the point $(x_0,y_0)$, into the formula (that is $dy = \frac{dy}{dx}dx$ where the derivative on the right-hand side is known at the point $(x_0,y_0)$: $dy/dx_{(x_0,y_0)} = -F_x(x_0,y_0)/F_y(x_0,y_0)$), we can then arrange terms and solve for the second derivative $d^2y/dx^2$. That is, from
$$F_{xx} dx^2 + (F_{xy}+F_{yx})\frac{dy}{dx}dx^2 + F_{yy}dy^2 + F_y\,d^2y= 0$$
we obtain
$$\frac{d^2y}{dx^2} =
- \frac
{ F_{xx} + (F_{xy}+F_{yx})\frac{dy}{dx}+ F_{yy}\left(\frac{dy}{dx}\right)^2 }
{ F_{y} }
.$$
This is understood as at the point $(x_0,y_0)$, and requires only that the function $F$ be twice-differentiable at the point, in addition to the hypothesis $F_y(x_0,y_0)\ne 0$. Second-differentiability at the point is true if the first and second partials of $F$ exist and are continuous in a disc around the point.

In that case, Clairaut's theorem implies that the mixed partials are equal $F_{xy}(x_0,y_0)=F_{yx}(x_0,y_0)$, and these terms can then be combined to give
$$\frac{d^2y}{dx^2} =
- \frac
{ F_{xx} - 2F_{xy}\frac{F_x}{F_y} + F_{yy}\left(\frac{F_x}{F_y}\right)^2 }
{ F_{y} }
.$$

Higher order derivatives (under the requisite smoothness hypotheses) are handled similarly.
