= Ernest Vessiot =

French mathematician (1965–1952)

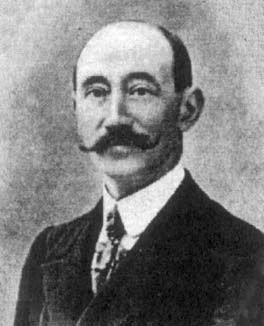
- Born: 8 March 1865; Marseille, France
- Died: 17 October 1952 (aged 87); La Bauche, Savoie, France
- Education: University of Paris
- Known for: Picard–Vessiot theory
- Awards: Poncelet Prize (1924)
- Scientific career
- Fields: Mathematics
- Workplaces: University of Paris
- Doctoral advisor: Charles Émile Picard
- Doctoral students: Jacques Herbrand; Joseph Pérès

Ernest Vessiot (French: [vesjo]; 8 March 1865 – 17 October 1952) was a French mathematician. He was born in Marseille, France, and died in La Bauche, Savoie, France. He entered the École Normale Supérieure in 1884.

He was Maître de Conférences at Lille University of Science and Technology in 1892-1893, then moved at Toulouse and Lyon.

After 1910, he was a professor of analytical mechanics and celestial mechanics at the University of Paris. He presided over entrance examinations at the École Polytechnique. As director of École Normale Supérieure until 1935, he overviewed the construction of its new physics, chemistry and geology buildings of 24, Rue Lhomond.

He was elected a member of the Académie des Sciences in 1943.

Vessiot's work on Picard–Vessiot theory dealt with the integrability of ordinary differential equations.

== Works ==
- Leçons De Géométrie Supérieure (Hermann, 1919)
- Vessiot, Ernest (1910), "Méthodes d'intégration élémentaires", in Molk, Jules (ed.), Encyclopédie des sciences mathématiques pures et appliquées, vol. 3, Gauthier-Villars & Teubner, pp. 58–170
