= Elementary function =

Type of mathematical function

In mathematics, elementary functions are a class of functions of a single variable (real or complex) that includes most of the functions of elementary calculus. The basic elementary functions are polynomial functions, rational functions, the trigonometric functions, the exponential and logarithm functions, the n-th root, and the inverse trigonometric functions, as well as those functions obtained by addition, multiplication, division, and composition of these. In general, elementary functions comprise the set of functions previously enumerated, all algebraic functions, and all functions obtained by roots of a polynomial whose coefficients are elementary.

The elementary functions were originally defined by Joseph Liouville in 1833. A key property is that all elementary functions have derivatives of any order, which are also elementary, and can be algorithmically computed by applying the differentiation rules (or the rules for implicit differentiation in the case of roots). The Taylor series of an elementary function converges in a neighborhood of every regular point of its domain. More generally, they are global analytic functions, defined (possibly with multiple values, such as the elementary function $\sqrt z$ or $\log z$) for every complex argument, except at singular points. In contrast, antiderivatives of elementary functions need not be elementary and is difficult to decide whether a specific elementary function has an elementary antiderivative.

Liouville's result is that, if an elementary function has an elementary antiderivative, then this antiderivative is a linear combination of logarithms, where the coefficients and the arguments of the logarithms are elementary functions involved, in some sense, in the definition of the function. The Risch algorithm (1968) can decide whether an elementary function has an elementary antiderivative, and, if so, to compute it. However, as of 2025, there is no full implementation.

== Examples ==
=== Basic examples ===
Elementary functions of a single variable $x$ include:

- Constant functions: $2$, $\pi$, $e$, the Euler–Mascheroni constant, Apéry's constant, Khinchin's constant, etc. Any constant real (or complex) number.
- Powers of $x$: $x^\alpha=e^{\alpha\log x}$, etc. (The exponent can be any real or complex constant.)
- Exponential functions: $e^x$, $\textstyle a^x=e^{x\log a}$
- Logarithms: $\log x$, $\textstyle \log_a x=\frac {\log x}{\log a}$
- Trigonometric functions: $\textstyle \sin x=\frac{e^{ix}-e^{-ix} }{2i}$, $\textstyle \cos x=\frac{e^{ix}+e^{-ix} }{2}$, $\textstyle \tan x=\frac{\sin x}{\cos x}$, etc.
- Inverse trigonometric functions: $\arcsin x$, $\arccos x$, etc.
- Hyperbolic functions: $\sinh x$, $\cosh x$, etc.
- Inverse hyperbolic functions: $\operatorname{arsinh} x$, $\operatorname{arcosh} x$, etc.
- All functions obtained by adding, subtracting, multiplying or dividing a finite number of any of the previous functions
- All functions obtained as roots of a polynomial whose coefficients are elementary functions
- All functions obtained by composing a finite number of any of the previously listed functions

Certain elementary functions of a single complex variable $z$, such as $\sqrt{z}$ and $\log z$, may be multivalued. Additionally, certain classes of functions may be obtained by others using the final two rules. For example, the exponential function $e^{z}$ composed with addition, subtraction, and division provides the hyperbolic functions, while initial composition with $iz$ instead provides the trigonometric functions.

=== Composite examples ===
Examples of elementary functions include:

- Addition, e.g. ($x + 1$)
- Multiplication, e.g. ($2x$)
- Polynomial functions
- $-i\log\left(x+i\sqrt{1-x^2}\right)$

The last function is equal to $\arccos x$, the inverse cosine, in the entire complex plane.

All monomials, polynomials, rational functions and algebraic functions are elementary.

=== Non-elementary functions ===
All elementary functions are analytic in the sense that they can be extended to functions of a complex variable (possibly multivalued) that are analytic except at singular points. More precisely, every regular branch of an elementary function admits analytic continuation along every path that, after its starting point, avoids a suitable at most countable exceptional set in the complex plane. Thus nonanalytic functions such as the absolute value function are not elementary, nor are most other piecewise-defined functions.

Not every analytic function is elementary. In fact, most special functions are not elementary. Non-elementary functions include:

- the gamma function
- non-elementary Liouvillian functions, including
  - the exponential integral (Ei) logarithmic integral (Li or li) and Fresnel integrals (S and C)
  - the error function, $\mathrm{erf}(x)=\frac{2}{\sqrt{\pi} }\int_0^x e^{-t^2}\,dt$, a fact that may not be immediately obvious, but can be proven using the Risch algorithm
- other nonelementary integrals, including the sine integral and elliptic integral.

== Real-variables and analytic branches ==
In elementary real-variable settings such as those in calculus and pre-calculus, expressions involving roots, logarithms, and inverse trigonometric functions are often interpreted using fixed real branches on specified real domains. This convention is distinct from the analytic convention used in the theory of elementary functions and integration in finite terms. Risch gives a precise definition of elementary functions "in the sense of analysis" by using functions of a complex variable rather than a real variable. In this setting the elementary functions are built using algebraic operations, exponentials, and logarithms, and are represented in differential fields of meromorphic functions on regions of the complex plane or on Riemann surfaces.

An algebraic equation such as
$$y^2=x^2$$
has the local analytic branches $y=x$ and $y=-x$. The real identity
$$\sqrt{x^2}=|x|$$
uses the convention that $\sqrt{\cdot}$ denotes the nonnegative real square root, and so changes from one analytic branch to the other at $x=0$. Thus the restrictions of $|x|$ to $(0,\infty)$ and $(-\infty,0)$ are elementary, but the usual real absolute value function on an interval containing $0$ is not a single analytic branch.

The same distinction appears in complex analysis. Whittaker and Watson note that although $x-iy$ and $|z|$, where $z=x+iy$, are functions of $z$ in a general sense, they are not elementary functions of the analytic type under consideration. In symbolic computation, functions such as absolute value, signum, and piecewise-defined functions can be treated instead by adjoining a step or conditional operation, which forms a separate class of piecewise function rings.

== Closure ==
It follows directly from the definition that the set of elementary functions is closed under arithmetic operations, (algebraic) root extraction and composition. The elementary functions are closed under differentiation. They are not closed under limits and infinite sums. Importantly, the elementary functions are not closed under integration, as shown by Liouville's theorem, see nonelementary integral. The Liouvillian functions are defined as the elementary functions and, recursively, the integrals of the Liouvillian functions.

== Extensions ==
In late-nineteenth-century analysis, elementary functions were often classified into successive kinds according to the number of independent integrations required for their definition. Functions expressible without any integration—those generated from rational functions by algebraic operations together with exponentiation, logarithms, and circular or hyperbolic trigonometric functions—were said to be elementary functions of the first kind (in the sense of Liouville). Functions defined by a single integration of an elementary function of the first kind, such as the error function and the elliptic integrals, were elementary functions of the second kind; their inverses, the elliptic functions, were considered of the same order. Higher "kinds" (third, fourth, etc.) corresponded to multiple integrals of algebraic functions, giving rise to hyperelliptic and more general Abelian functions.

The essential point of the classification was that the class of elementary functions of any given kind be closed under the elementary operations—addition, multiplication, composition, and differentiation—so that differentiation never leads outside the same class, while integration may ascend to the next higher kind.

More recently, some have proposed extending the set of elementary functions by extending with certain transcendental functions, to include, for example, the Lambert W function or elliptic functions, all of which are analytic. The key attribute, from the perspective of the Liouville theorem, is that as a class, they are closed under taking derivatives. For example, the Lambert function $w=W(z)$, which is defined implicitly by the equation $we^w=z$, has a derivative which can be obtained by implicit differentiation:

$$W'(z) = \frac{e^{-W(z)}}{1+W(z)},$$

which is again "elementary", provided that $W(z)$ is.

== Differential algebra ==
The mathematical definition of an elementary function is formalized in differential algebra. A differential field is a field with an extra operation of derivation (algebraic version of differentiation). Using the derivation operation new equations can be written and their solutions used in extensions of the algebra. By starting with the field of rational functions, two special types of transcendental extensions (the logarithm and the exponential) can be added to the field building a tower containing elementary functions.

A differential field $F$ is a field together with a derivation $u\mapsto \partial u$ that maps $F$ to itself. The derivation generalizes derivative, being linear (that is, $\partial (u + v) = \partial u + \partial v$) and satisfying the Leibniz product rule (that is,$\partial(u\cdot v)=\partial u\cdot v+u\cdot\partial v$) for every two elements $u$ and $v$ in $F$. The rational functions over $\Q$ or $\C$ form a basic examples of differential fields, when equipped with the usual derivative.

An element $h$ of $F$ is a constant if $\partial h=0$. The constants of $F$ form a differential field with zero derivative. Care must be taken that a differential field extension of a differential field may enlarge the field of constants.

A function $u$ of a differential extension $G$ of a differential field $F$ is an elementary function over $F$ if it belongs to a finite chain (for inclusion) of differential subfields of $G$ that starts from $F$ and is such that each is generated over the preceding one by a function that is either

- algebraic over the preceding field, or
- an exponential, that is, $\partial u = u\partial a$ for some a belonging to a prior subfield, or
- a logarithm, that is, $\partial u = \partial a/a$ for some a belonging to a prior subfield, (see Liouville's theorem)

With this definition, the usual elementary functions are exactly the function that are elementary over the field of the rational functions. This generalized definition allows considering every transcendental function as elementary for applying Liouville's theorem.

== See also ==
- Algebraic function
- Closed-form expression – Mathematical formula involving a given set of operations
- Differential Galois theory
- Elementary function arithmetic – System of arithmetic in proof theory
- Liouville's theorem (differential algebra) – Criterion for integration in terms of elementary functions
- Richardson's theorem: Undecidability of inequalities of real numbers formed out of a class of elementary functions
- Tarski's high school algebra problem
- Transcendental function – Analytic function that does not satisfy a polynomial equation
