= Picard–Vessiot theory =

Study of differential field extensions induced by linear differential equations

In differential algebra, Picard–Vessiot theory is the study of the differential field extension generated by the solutions of a linear differential equation, using the differential Galois group of the field extension. A major goal is to describe when the differential equation can be solved by quadratures in terms of properties of the differential Galois group. The theory was initiated by Émile Picard and Ernest Vessiot from about 1883 to 1904.

Kolchin (1973) and van der Put & Singer (2003) give detailed accounts of Picard–Vessiot theory.

== History ==
The history of Picard–Vessiot theory is discussed by Borel (2001, chapter VIII).

Picard–Vessiot theory was developed by Picard between 1883 and 1898 and by Vessiot from 1892 to 1904 (summarized in (Picard 1908, chapter XVII) and Vessiot (1892, 1910)). The main result of their theory says very roughly that a linear differential equation can be solved by quadratures if and only if its differential Galois group is connected and solvable. Unfortunately it is hard to tell exactly what they proved as the concept of being "solvable by quadratures" is not defined precisely or used consistently in their papers. Kolchin (1946, 1948) gave precise definitions of the necessary concepts and proved a rigorous version of this theorem.

Kolchin (1952) extended Picard–Vessiot theory to partial differential fields (with several commuting derivations).

Kovacic (1986) described an algorithm for deciding whether second order homogeneous linear equations can be solved by quadratures, known as Kovacic's algorithm.

== Picard–Vessiot extensions and rings ==
An extension F ⊆ K of differential fields is called a Picard–Vessiot extension if all constants are in F and K can be generated by adjoining the solutions of a homogeneous linear ordinary differential polynomial.

A Picard–Vessiot ring R over the differential field F is a differential ring over F that is simple (no differential ideals other than 0 and R) and generated as a k-algebra by the coefficients of A and 1/det(A), where A is an invertible matrix over F such that B = A′/A has coefficients in F. (So A is a fundamental matrix for the differential equation y′ = By.)

== Liouvillian extensions ==
An extension F ⊆ K of differential fields is called Liouvillian if all constants are in F, and K can be generated by adjoining a finite number of integrals, exponential of integrals, and algebraic functions. Here, an integral of an element a is defined to be any solution of y′ = a, and an exponential of an integral of a is defined to be any solution of y′ = ay.

A Picard–Vessiot extension is Liouvillian if and only if the identity component of its differential Galois group is solvable (Kolchin 1948, p. 38, van der Put & Singer 2003, Theorem 1.39). More precisely, extensions by algebraic functions correspond to finite differential Galois groups, extensions by integrals correspond to subquotients of the differential Galois group that are 1-dimensional and unipotent, and extensions by exponentials of integrals correspond to subquotients of the differential Galois group that are 1-dimensional and reductive (tori).

== Sources ==
- Beukers, Frits (1992), "8. Differential Galois theory", in Waldschmidt, Michel; Moussa, Pierre; Luck, Jean-Marc; et al. (eds.), From number theory to physics. Lectures of a meeting on number theory and physics held at the Centre de Physique, Les Houches (France), March 7–16, 1989, Berlin: Springer-Verlag, pp. 413–439, ISBN 3-540-53342-7, Zbl 0813.12001
- Borel, Armand (2001), Essays in the history of Lie groups and algebraic groups, History of Mathematics, vol. 21, Providence, R.I.: American Mathematical Society, ISBN 978-0-8218-0288-5, MR 1847105
- Kolchin, E. R. (1946), "The Picard–Vessiot theory of homogeneous linear ordinary differential equations", Proceedings of the National Academy of Sciences of the United States of America, 32 (12): 308–311, Bibcode:1946PNAS...32..308K, doi:10.1073/pnas.32.12.308, ISSN 0027-8424, JSTOR 87871, MR 0018168, PMC 1078958, PMID 16578224
- Kolchin, E. R. (1948), "Algebraic matric groups and the Picard–Vessiot theory of homogeneous linear ordinary differential equations", Annals of Mathematics, Second Series, 49 (1): 1–42, doi:10.2307/1969111, ISSN 0003-486X, JSTOR 1969111, MR 0024884
- Kolchin, E. R. (1952), "Picard–Vessiot theory of partial differential fields", Proceedings of the American Mathematical Society, 3 (4): 596–603, doi:10.2307/2032594, ISSN 0002-9939, JSTOR 2032594, MR 0049883
- Kolchin, E. R. (1973), Differential algebra and algebraic groups, Pure and Applied Mathematics, vol. 54, Boston, MA: Academic Press, ISBN 978-0-12-417650-8, MR 0568864
- Kovacic, Jerald J. (1986), "An algorithm for solving second order linear homogeneous differential equations", Journal of Symbolic Computation, 2 (1): 3–43, doi:10.1016/S0747-7171(86)80010-4, ISSN 0747-7171, MR 0839134
- Picard, Émile (1908) [First published 1896], Traité d'analyse (in French), vol. 3 (deuxieme ed.), Gauthier-Villars – via Internet Archive
- van der Put, Marius; Singer, Michael F. (2003), Galois theory of linear differential equations, Grundlehren der Mathematischen Wissenschaften [Fundamental Principles of Mathematical Sciences], vol. 328, Berlin, New York: Springer-Verlag, ISBN 978-3-540-44228-8, MR 1960772
- Vessiot, Ernest (1892), "Sur l'intégration des équations différentielles linéaires", Annales Scientifiques de l'École Normale Supérieure, 3 (in French), 9: 197–280, doi:10.24033/asens.372, hdl:2027/hvd.32044102925955
- Vessiot, Ernest (1910), "Méthodes d'intégration élémentaires", in Molk, Jules (ed.), Encyclopédie des sciences mathématiques pures et appliquées (in French), vol. 3, Gauthier-Villars & Teubner, pp. 58–170
- Teresa Crespo and Zbigniew Hajto (2011): Algebraic Groups and Differential Galois Theory, AMS (GSM122), ISBN 978-0-8218-5318-4.
