= Michael F. Singer =

American mathematician

Michael F. Singer (born 25 February 1950 in New York City) is an American mathematician.

Singer graduated from New York University with a bachelor's degree in 1970 and from the University of California, Berkeley with a master's degree in 1972 and a doctorate in 1974 under the supervision of Maxwell Rosenlicht with thesis Functions Satisfying Elementary Relations. From 1974 to 1976 Singer was an instructor at the State University of New York at Stony Brook (SUNY). At North Carolina State University he was from 1974 to 1976 an assistant professor, from 1976 to 1982 an associate professor, and from 1986 to 2016 a full professor, retiring as professor emeritus in 2016.

For the academic year 1978–1979 and in spring 1985 Singer was at the Institute for Advanced Study. In 2001/02 he was Deputy Director and 2002/03 Acting Director of MSRI. He was a visiting professor at the University of Bonn, the University of Rennes, the University of Strasbourg, and the University of Linz, and a visiting scholar at the Isaac Newton Institute. In 2012 he was elected a Fellow of the American Mathematical Society.

His research deals with differential algebraic equation and algorithmic algebra.

== Selected publications ==
- with Marius van der Put: Galois theory of linear differential equations, Grundlehren der mathematischen Wissenschaften, Springer Verlag, 2003
- with Marius van der Put: Galois Theory of Difference Equations, Lecture Notes in Mathematics 1666, Springer 1997
- as editor: Differential Equations and Computer Algebra, Academic Press 1991
