= Constant problem =

Problem of deciding whether an expression equals zero

In mathematics, the constant problem is the problem of deciding whether a given expression is equal to zero.

== The problem ==
This problem is also referred to as the identity problem or the method of zero estimates. It has no formal statement as such but refers to a general problem prevalent in transcendental number theory. Often proofs in transcendence theory are proofs by contradiction. Specifically, they use some auxiliary function to create an integer n ≥ 0, which is shown to satisfy n < 1. Clearly, this means that n must have the value zero, and so a contradiction arises if one can show that in fact n is not zero.

In many transcendence proofs, proving that n ≠ 0 is very difficult, and hence considerable work has been done to develop methods that can be used to prove the non-vanishing of certain expressions. The sheer generality of the problem is what makes it difficult to prove general results or come up with general methods for attacking it. The number n that arises may involve integrals, limits, polynomials, other functions, and determinants of matrices.

== Results ==
In certain cases, algorithms or other methods exist for proving that a given expression is non-zero, or of showing that the problem is undecidable. For example, if x_{1}, ..., x_{n} are real numbers, then there is an algorithm for deciding whether there are integers a_{1}, ..., a_{n} such that

$$a_1 x_1 + \cdots + a_n x_n = 0\,.$$

If the expression we are interested in contains an oscillating function, such as the sine or cosine function, then it has been shown that the problem is undecidable, a result known as Richardson's theorem. In general, methods specific to the expression being studied are required to prove that it cannot be zero.

== See also ==
- Integer relation algorithm
