= Differential Galois theory =

Study of Galois symmetry groups of differential fields

In mathematics, differential Galois theory is the field that studies extensions of differential fields.

Whereas algebraic Galois theory studies extensions of algebraic fields, differential Galois theory studies extensions of differential fields, i.e. fields that are equipped with a derivation. A derivation satisfies the properties

D(xy) = (Dx)y + xDy

and

D(x + y) = Dx + Dy

for any field elements x and y. (These identities correspond to the Leibniz product rule and the linearity of derivatives.) Much of the theory of differential Galois theory is analogous to algebraic Galois theory. One difference between the two constructions is that the Galois groups in differential Galois theory tend to be matrix Lie groups, as compared with the finite groups often encountered in algebraic Galois theory.

Most of differential Galois theory is analogous to algebraic Galois theory. The significant difference in the structure is that the Galois group in differential Galois theory is an algebraic group, whereas in algebraic Galois theory, it is a profinite group equipped with the Krull topology.

== Motivation and elementary functions ==
In mathematics, the indefinite integral of an elementary function may be a non-elementary function. A well known example is the indefinite integral of the elementary function $e^{-x^2}$ is the non-elementary function, the error function $\operatorname{erf}x$, familiar in statistics. The indefinite integrals of elementary functions sinc function $\tfrac{\sin x}{x}$ and $x^x$ are also non-elementary functions.

The concept of elementary functions is merely conventional. If we redefine elementary functions to include the error function, then under this definition, the indefinite integral of $e^{-x^2}$ would be considered an elementary function. However, for any finite set of "elementary functions" that extends the standard set, there will be functions whose indefinite integrals are not elementary.

Using the theory of differential Galois theory, it is possible to determine which indefinite integrals of elementary functions cannot be expressed as elementary functions. Differential Galois theory is based on the framework of Galois theory. While algebraic Galois theory studies field extensions of fields, differential Galois theory studies extensions of differential fields—fields with a derivation D.

== Definition ==
For any differential field F with derivation D, there exists a subfield called the field of constants of F, defined as:

Con(F) = {f ∈ F | Df = 0}.

The field of constants contains the prime field of F.

Given two differential fields F and G, G is called a simple differential extension of F if for some element t, G = F<t> := F(t, Dt, D(Dt), …). If the simple extension G satisfies

∃s∈F; Dt = Ds/s,

then G is called a logarithmic extension of F.

This has the form of a logarithmic derivative. Intuitively, t can be thought of as the logarithm of some element s in F, corresponding to the usual chain rule. F does not necessarily have a uniquely defined logarithm. Various logarithmic extensions of F can be considered. Similarly, an exponential extension satisfies

∃s∈F; Dt = tDs,

and a differential extension satisfies

∃s∈F; Dt = s.

Keeping the above caveat in mind, this element can be regarded as the exponential of an element s in F. Finally, if there is a finite sequence of intermediate fields from F to G with Con(F) = Con(G), such that each extension in the sequence is either a finite algebraic extension, a logarithmic extension, or an exponential extension, then G is called an elementary differential extension .

Consider the homogeneous linear differential equation for $a_1, \cdots , a_n \in F$:

$D^{n}y + a_{1}D^{n-1}y + \cdots + a_{n-1}Dy + a_{n}y = 0$ … (1).

There exist at most n linearly independent solutions over the field of constants. An extension G of F is a Picard-Vessiot extension for the differential equation (1) if G is generated by all solutions of (1) and satisfies Con(F) = Con(G). A differential extension or exponential extension becomes a Picard-Vessiot extension when the field has characteristic zero and the constant fields of the extended fields match.

An extension G of F is a Liouville extension if Con(F) = Con(G) is an algebraically closed field, and there exists an increasing chain of subfields

F = F_{0} ⊂ F_{1} ⊂ … ⊂ F_{n} = G

such that each extension F_{k+1} : F_{k} is either a finite algebraic extension, a differential extension, or an exponential extension. A Liouville extension of the rational function field C(x) consists of functions obtained by finite combinations of rational functions, exponential functions, roots of algebraic equations, and their indefinite integrals. Clearly, logarithmic functions, trigonometric functions, and their inverses are Liouville functions over C(x), and especially elementary differential extensions are Liouville extensions.

An example of a function that is contained in an elementary extension over C(x) but not in a Liouville extension is the indefinite integral of $e^{-x^2}$.

== Basic properties ==
For a differential field F, if G is a separable algebraic extension of F, the derivation of F uniquely extends to a derivation of G. Hence, G uniquely inherits the differential structure of F.

Suppose F and G are differential fields satisfying Con(F) = Con(G), and G is an elementary differential extension of F. Let a ∈ F and y ∈ G such that Dy = a (i.e., G contains the indefinite integral of a). Then there exist c_{1}, …, c_{n} ∈ Con(F) and u_{1}, …, u_{n}, v ∈ F such that

$$a = c_1\frac{Du_1}{u_1} + \dotsb + c_n\frac{Du_n}{u_n} + Dv$$

(Liouville's theorem). In other words, only functions whose indefinite integrals are elementary (i.e., at worst contained within the elementary differential extension of F) have the form stated in the theorem. Intuitively, only elementary indefinite integrals can be expressed as the sum of a finite number of logarithms of simple functions.

If G/F is a Picard-Vessiot extension, then G being a Liouville extension of F is equivalent to the differential Galois group having a solvable identity component. Furthermore, G being a Liouville extension of F is equivalent to G being embeddable in some Liouville extension field of F.

== Examples ==
- The field of rational functions of one complex variable $\C(x)$ becomes a differential field when taking the usual differentiation with respect to the variable $x$ as the derivation. The field of constants of this field is the complex number field $\C$.
- By Liouville's theorem mentioned above, if $f(z)$ and $g(z)$ are rational functions in $z$, $f(z)$ is non-zero, and $g(z)$ is non-constant, then $\textstyle \int f(z)e^{g(z)} \, dz$ is an elementary function if and only if there exists a rational function $h(z)$ such that $f(z) = h'(z) + h(z)g'(z)\,$. The fact that the error function and the sine integral (indefinite integral of the sinc function) cannot be expressed as elementary functions follows immediately from this property.
- In the case of the differential equation $y'' + y = 0$, the Galois group is the multiplicative group of complex numbers with absolute value $1$, also known as the circle group. This is an example of a solvable group, and indeed, the solutions to this differential equation are elementary functions (trigonometric functions in this case).
- The differential Galois group of the Airy equation, $y'' - xy = 0$, over the complex numbers is the special linear group of degree two, $\operatorname{SL}(2,\C)$. This group is not solvable, indicating that its solutions cannot be expressed using elementary functions. Instead, the solutions are known as Airy functions.

== Applications ==
Differential Galois theory has numerous applications in mathematics and physics. It is used, for instance, in determining whether a given differential equation can be solved by quadrature (integration). It also has applications in the study of dynamic systems, including the integrability of Hamiltonian systems in classical mechanics.

One significant application is the analysis of integrability conditions for differential equations, which has implications in the study of symmetries and conservation laws in physics.

== See also ==
- Picard–Vessiot theory

== Sources ==
- Kolchin, E. R., Differential Algebra and Algebraic Groups, Academic Press, 1973.
- Hubbard, John H.; Lundell, Benjamin E. (2011). "A First Look at Differential Algebra" (PDF). The American Mathematical Monthly. 118 (3): 245–261. doi:10.4169/amer.math.monthly.118.03.245. JSTOR 10.4169/amer.math.monthly.118.03.245. S2CID 1567399.
- Bertrand, D. (1996), "Review of "Lectures on differential Galois theory"" (PDF), Bulletin of the American Mathematical Society, 33 (2), doi:10.1090/s0273-0979-96-00652-0, ISSN 0002-9904
- Beukers, Frits (1992), "8. Differential Galois theory", in Waldschmidt, Michel; Moussa, Pierre; Luck, Jean-Marc; Itzykson, Claude (eds.), From number theory to physics. Lectures of a meeting on number theory and physics held at the Centre de Physique, Les Houches (France), March 7–16, 1989, Berlin: Springer-Verlag, pp. 413–439, ISBN 3-540-53342-7, Zbl 0813.12001
- Magid, Andy R. (1994), Lectures on differential Galois theory, University Lecture Series, vol. 7, Providence, R.I.: American Mathematical Society, ISBN 978-0-8218-7004-4, MR 1301076
- Magid, Andy R. (1999), "Differential Galois theory" (PDF), Notices of the American Mathematical Society, 46 (9): 1041–1049, ISSN 0002-9920, MR 1710665
- van der Put, Marius; Singer, Michael F. (2003), Galois theory of linear differential equations, Grundlehren der Mathematischen Wissenschaften [Fundamental Principles of Mathematical Sciences], vol. 328, Berlin, New York: Springer-Verlag, ISBN 978-3-540-44228-8, MR 1960772
- Juan J. Morales Ruiz : Differential Galois Theory and Non-Integrability of Hamiltonian Systems, Birkhaeuser, 1999, ISBN 978-3764360788.
