= Trigonometric integral =

Special function defined by an integral

Plot of the hyperbolic sine integral function Shi(z) in the complex plane from −2 − 2i to 2 + 2i

Si(x) (blue) and Ci(x) (green) shown on the same plot.

Sine integral in the complex plane, plotted with a variant of domain coloring.

Cosine integral in the complex plane. Note the branch cut along the negative real axis.

In mathematics, trigonometric integrals are a family of nonelementary integrals involving trigonometric functions.

== Sine integral ==
Plot of Si(x) for 0 ≤ x ≤ 8π.

Plot of the cosine integral function Ci(z) in the complex plane from −2 − 2i to 2 + 2i

The different sine integral definitions are
$$\begin{align}
\operatorname{Si}(x) &= \hphantom{-}\int_0^x\frac{\sin t}{t}\,dt \\
\operatorname{si}(x) &= -\int_x^\infty\frac{\sin t}{t}\,dt~.
\end{align}$$

Note that the integrand $\frac{\sin t}{t}$ is the sinc function, and also the zeroth spherical Bessel function. Since $\operatorname{sinc}$ is an even entire function (holomorphic over the entire complex plane), $\operatorname{Si}$ is entire, odd, and the integral in its definition can be taken along any path connecting the endpoints.

By definition, $\operatorname{Si}(x)$ is the antiderivative of $\textstyle \frac{\sin x}{x}$ whose value is zero at $x = 0$, and $\operatorname{si}(x)$ is the antiderivative whose value is zero at $x = \infty$. Their difference is given by the Dirichlet integral,
$$\operatorname{Si}(x) - \operatorname{si}(x) = \int_0^\infty\frac{\sin t}{t}\,dt = \frac{\pi}{2} \quad \text{ or } \quad \operatorname{Si}(x) = \frac{\pi}{2} + \operatorname{si}(x) ~.$$

In signal processing, the oscillations of the sine integral cause overshoot and ringing artifacts when using the sinc filter, and frequency domain ringing if using a truncated sinc filter as a low-pass filter.

Related is the Gibbs phenomenon: If the sine integral is considered as the convolution of the sinc function with the Heaviside step function, this corresponds to truncating the Fourier series, which is the cause of the Gibbs phenomenon.

== Cosine integral ==
Plot of Ci(x) for 0 < x ≤ 8π

The different cosine integral definitions are
$$\operatorname{Cin}(x) \equiv \int_0^x \frac{1 - \cos t}{t}\,dt.$$

$\operatorname{Cin}$ is an even, entire function. For that reason, some texts define $\operatorname{Cin}$ as the primary function, and derive $\operatorname{Ci}$ in terms of $\operatorname{Cin}$.

$$\begin{align}\operatorname{Ci}(x)
&\equiv~ -\int_x^\infty \frac{\cos t}{t} \, dt \\
&= \gamma + \ln x - \int_0^x \frac{1 - \cos t}{t} \, dt \\[0.4em]
&= \gamma + \ln x - \operatorname{Cin}(x),
\end{align}$$
for $|\operatorname{Arg}(x)| < \pi$, where $\gamma \approx 0.57721566490$ is the Euler–Mascheroni constant. Some texts use $\operatorname{ci}$ instead of $\operatorname{Ci}$. The restriction on Arg(x) is to avoid a discontinuity (shown as the orange vs. blue area on the left half of the plot above) that arises because of a branch cut in the standard logarithm function ($\ln$).

$\operatorname{Ci}(x)$ is the antiderivative of $\textstyle \frac{\cos x}{x}$ (which vanishes as $x \to \infty$). The two definitions are related by
$$\operatorname{Ci}(x) = \gamma + \ln x - \operatorname{Cin}(x).$$

== Hyperbolic sine integral ==
The hyperbolic sine integral is defined as
$$\operatorname{Shi}(x) =\int_0^x \frac {\sinh t}{t}\,dt.$$

It is related to the ordinary sine integral by
$$\operatorname{Si}(ix) = i\operatorname{Shi}(x).$$

== Hyperbolic cosine integral ==
The hyperbolic cosine integral is

Plot of the hyperbolic cosine integral function Chi(z) in the complex plane from −2 − 2i to 2 + 2i

$$\operatorname{Chi}(x) = \gamma+\ln x + \int_0^x\frac{\cosh(t) - 1}{t}\,dt \qquad ~ \text{ for } ~ \left| \operatorname{Arg}(x) \right| < \pi~,$$
where $\gamma$ is the Euler–Mascheroni constant.

It has the series expansion
$$\operatorname{Chi}(x) = \gamma + \ln x + \frac {x^2}{4} + \frac {x^4}{96} + \frac {x^6}{4320} + \frac {x^8}{322560} + \frac{x^{10}}{36288000} + O(x^{12}).$$

== Auxiliary functions ==
Trigonometric integrals can be understood in terms of the so-called "auxiliary functions"
$$\begin{align}
f(x) &\equiv \int_0^\infty \frac{\sin t}{t+x}\,dt \quad = \int_0^\infty \frac{e^{-x t}}{t^2 + 1}\,dt \\[.3em]
&= \hphantom{-}\operatorname{Ci}(x) \sin x - \operatorname{si}(x) \cos x \\
&= \hphantom{-}\operatorname{Ci}(x) \sin x + \left[\frac{\pi}{2} - \operatorname{Si}(x) \right] \cos x\,, \\[0.5em]
g(x) &\equiv \int_0^\infty \frac{\cos t}{t+x}\,dt \quad = \int_0^\infty \frac{t e^{-x t}}{t^2 + 1}\,dt \\[.3em]
&= -\operatorname{Ci}(x) \cos x - \operatorname{si}(x)  \sin x \\
&= -\operatorname{Ci}(x) \cos x + \left[\frac{\pi}{2} - \operatorname{Si}(x) \right] \sin x\,.
\end{align}$$
Using these functions, the trigonometric integrals may be re-expressed as
$$\begin{align}
\operatorname{Si}(x) &= \frac{\pi}{2} - f(x) \cos x + g(x) \sin x\,, \\
\operatorname{Ci}(x) &= \hphantom{\frac{\pi}{2} -\mathop{} }f(x) \sin x - g(x) \cos x\,.
\end{align}$$

== Nielsen's spiral ==
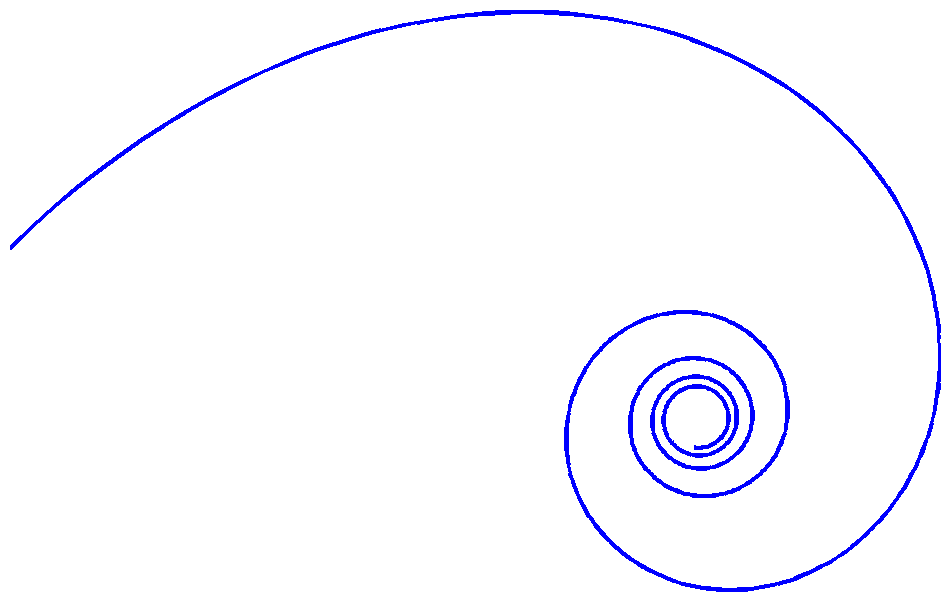
Nielsen's spiral.

The spiral formed by parametric plot of $\operatorname{si}$, $\operatorname{ci}$ is known as Nielsen's spiral.
$$\begin{align}
x(t) &= a \times \operatorname{ci}(t) \\
y(t) &= a \times \operatorname{si}(t)
\end{align}$$

The spiral is closely related to the Fresnel integrals and the Euler spiral.Nielsen's spiral has applications in vision processing, road and track construction and other areas.

== Expansion ==
Various expansions can be used for evaluation of trigonometric integrals, depending on the range of the argument.

=== Asymptotic series (for large argument) ===
$$\begin{align}
\operatorname{Si}(x) &\sim \frac{\pi}{2}
- \frac{\cos x}{x}\left(1-\frac{2!}{x^2}+\frac{4!}{x^4}-\frac{6!}{x^6}+\cdots\right)
- \frac{\sin x}{x}\left(\frac{1}{x}-\frac{3!}{x^3}+\frac{5!}{x^5}-\frac{7!}{x^7}+\cdots\right)\,, \\
\operatorname{Ci}(x) &\sim \hphantom{\frac{\pi}{2} - \mathop{}}\frac{\sin x}{x}\left(1-\frac{2!}{x^2}+\frac{4!}{x^4}-\frac{6!}{x^6}+\cdots\right)
- \frac{\cos x}{x}\left(\frac{1}{x}-\frac{3!}{x^{3}}+\frac{5!}{x^5}-\frac{7!}{x^7}+\cdots\right)\,.
\end{align}$$

These series are asymptotic and divergent, although can be used for estimates and even precise evaluation at $\Re(x) \gg 1$.

=== Convergent series ===
$$\operatorname{Si}(x)= \sum_{n=0}^\infty \frac{(-1)^{n}x^{2n+1}}{(2n+1)(2n+1)!}=x-\frac{x^3}{3!\cdot3}+\frac{x^5}{5!\cdot5}-\frac{x^7}{7! \cdot7}\pm\cdots$$
$$\operatorname{Ci}(x)= \gamma+\ln x+\sum_{n=1}^{\infty}\frac{(-1)^{n}x^{2n}}{2n(2n)!}=\gamma+\ln x-\frac{x^2}{2!\cdot2} + \frac{x^4}{4! \cdot4}\mp\cdots$$

These series are convergent at any complex $x$, although for $|x| \gg 1$, the series will converge slowly initially, requiring many terms for high precision.

=== Derivation of series expansion ===
From the Maclaurin series expansion of sine:
$$\begin{align}
& \sin x = x - \frac{x^3}{3!}+\frac{x^5}{5!}- \frac{x^7}{7!}+\frac{x^9}{9!}-\frac{x^{11}}{11!} + \cdots \\
& \frac{\sin x}{x} = 1 - \frac{x^2}{3!}+\frac{x^4}{5!}- \frac{x^6}{7!}+\frac{x^8}{9!}-\frac{x^{10}}{11!}+\cdots \\
& \therefore\int \frac{\sin x}{x}dx = x - \frac{x^3}{3!\cdot3}+\frac{x^5}{5!\cdot5}- \frac{x^7}{7!\cdot7}+\frac{x^9}{9!\cdot9}-\frac{x^{11}}{11!\cdot11}+\cdots
\end{align}$$

== Relation with the exponential integral of imaginary argument ==
The function
$$\operatorname{E}_1(z) = \int_1^\infty \frac{\exp(-zt)}{t}\,dt \qquad~\text{ for }~ \Re(z) \ge 0$$
is called the exponential integral. It is closely related to Si and Ci,
$$\operatorname{E}_1(i x) = i\left(-\frac{\pi}{2} + \operatorname{Si}(x)\right)-\operatorname{Ci}(x) = i \operatorname{si}(x) - \operatorname{Ci}(x) \qquad ~\text{ for }~ x > 0 ~.$$

As each respective function is analytic except for the cut at negative values of the argument, the area of validity of the relation should be extended to (Outside this range, additional terms which are integer factors of π appear in the expression.)

Cases of imaginary argument of the generalized integro-exponential function are
$$\int_1^\infty \cos(ax)\frac{\ln x}{x} \, dx =
-\frac{\pi^2}{24}+\gamma\left(\frac{\gamma}{2}+\ln a\right)+\frac{\ln^2a}{2}
+\sum_{n\ge 1} \frac{(-a^2)^n}{(2n)!(2n)^2} ~,$$
which is the real part of
$$\int_1^\infty e^{iax}\frac{\ln x}{x}\,dx =
-\frac{\pi^2}{24} + \gamma\left(\frac{\gamma}{2}+\ln a\right)+\frac{\ln^2 a}{2}
-\frac{\pi}{2}i\left(\gamma+\ln a\right) + \sum_{n\ge 1}\frac{(ia)^n}{n!n^2}  ~.$$

Similarly
$$\int_1^\infty e^{iax}\frac{\ln x}{x^2}\,dx =
1 + ia\left[ -\frac{\pi^2}{24} + \gamma \left( \frac{\gamma}{2} + \ln a - 1 \right) + \frac{\ln^2 a}{2} - \ln a + 1 \right]
+ \frac{\pi a}{2} \Bigl( \gamma+\ln a - 1 \Bigr)
+ \sum_{n\ge 1}\frac{(ia)^{n+1}}{(n+1)!n^2}~.$$

== Efficient evaluation ==
Padé approximants of the convergent Taylor series provide an efficient way to evaluate the functions for small arguments. The following formulae are accurate to better than 1×10^{−16} for $0 \le x \le 4$:
$$\begin{align}
\operatorname{Si}(x) \approx&\mathop{} x \cdot \left(\begin{smallmatrix}
1 & - 4.54393409816329991\cdot 10^{-2} \cdot x^2
& + 1.15457225751016682\cdot 10^{-3} \cdot x^4
& - 1.41018536821330254\cdot 10^{-5} \cdot x^6 \\
& + 9.43280809438713025 \cdot 10^{-8} \cdot x^8
& - 3.53201978997168357 \cdot 10^{-10} \cdot x^{10}
& + 7.08240282274875911 \cdot 10^{-13} \cdot x^{12} \\
& - 6.05338212010422477 \cdot 10^{-16} \cdot x^{14} \\ \hline
1 & + 1.01162145739225565 \cdot 10^{-2} \cdot x^2
& + 4.99175116169755106 \cdot 10^{-5} \cdot x^4
& + 1.55654986308745614 \cdot 10^{-7} \cdot x^6 \\
& + 3.28067571055789734 \cdot 10^{-10} \cdot x^8
& + 4.5049097575386581 \cdot 10^{-13} \cdot x^{10}
& + 3.21107051193712168 \cdot 10^{-16} \cdot x^{12}
\end{smallmatrix}\right) \\[1em]
\operatorname{Ci}(x) \approx &\mathop{} \gamma + \ln(x) + \\
& x^2 \cdot \left(\begin{smallmatrix}
-0.25 & + 7.51851524438898291 \cdot 10^{-3} \cdot x^2
& - 1.27528342240267686 \cdot 10^{-4} \cdot x^4
& + 1.05297363846239184 \cdot 10^{-6} \cdot x^6 \\
& - 4.68889508144848019 \cdot 10^{-9} \cdot x^8
& + 1.06480802891189243 \cdot 10^{-11} \cdot x^{10}
& - 9.93728488857585407 \cdot 10^{-15} \cdot x^{12} \\ \hline
1 & + 1.1592605689110735 \cdot 10^{-2} \cdot x^2
& + 6.72126800814254432 \cdot 10^{-5} \cdot x^4
& + 2.55533277086129636 \cdot 10^{-7} \cdot x^6 \\
& + 6.97071295760958946 \cdot 10^{-10} \cdot x^8
& + 1.38536352772778619 \cdot 10^{-12} \cdot x^{10}
& + 1.89106054713059759 \cdot 10^{-15} \cdot x^{12} \\
& + 1.39759616731376855 \cdot 10^{-18} \cdot x^{14}
\end{smallmatrix}\right)
\end{align}$$

The integrals may be evaluated indirectly via auxiliary functions $f(x)$ and $g(x)$ defined as:
$$\begin{align}
\operatorname{Si}(x) &= \frac{\pi}{2}-f(x)\cos x - g(x)\sin x \,, \\
\operatorname{Ci}(x) &= \hphantom{\frac{\pi}{2} -\mathop{}} f(x)\sin x - g(x)\cos x \,;
\end{align}$$
or equivalently:
$$\begin{align}
f(x) &\equiv \left[\frac{\pi}{2} - \operatorname{Si}(x)\right] \cos x + \operatorname{Ci}(x) \sin x \,, \\
g(x) &\equiv \left[\frac{\pi}{2} - \operatorname{Si}(x)\right] \sin x - \operatorname{Ci}(x) \cos x \,.
\end{align}$$

For $x \ge 4$ the Padé rational functions given below approximate $f(x)$ and $g(x)$ with error less than 1×10^{−16}:

$$\begin{align}
f(x) \approx & \mathop{} \dfrac{1}{x} \cdot \left(\begin{smallmatrix}
1 & + 7.44437068161936700618 \cdot 10^2 \cdot x^{-2}
& + 1.96396372895146869801 \cdot 10^5 \cdot x^{-4}
& + 2.37750310125431834034 \cdot 10^7 \cdot x^{-6} \\
& + 1.43073403821274636888 \cdot 10^9 \cdot x^{-8}
& + 4.33736238870432522765 \cdot 10^{10} \cdot x^{-10}
& + 6.40533830574022022911 \cdot 10^{11} \cdot x^{-12} \\
& + 4.20968180571076940208 \cdot 10^{12} \cdot x^{-14}
& + 1.00795182980368574617 \cdot 10^{13} \cdot x^{-16}
& + 4.94816688199951963482 \cdot 10^{12} \cdot x^{-18} \\
& - 4.94701168645415959931 \cdot 10^{11} \cdot x^{-20} \\ \hline
1 & + 7.46437068161927678031 \cdot 10^2 \cdot x^{-2}
& + 1.97865247031583951450 \cdot 10^5 \cdot x^{-4}
& + 2.41535670165126845144 \cdot 10^7 \cdot x^{-6} \\
& + 1.47478952192985464958 \cdot 10^9 \cdot x^{-8}
& + 4.58595115847765779830 \cdot 10^{10} \cdot x^{-10}
& + 7.08501308149515401563 \cdot 10^{11} \cdot x^{-12} \\
& + 5.06084464593475076774 \cdot 10^{12} \cdot x^{-14}
& + 1.43468549171581016479 \cdot 10^{13} \cdot x^{-16}
& + 1.11535493509914254097 \cdot 10^{13} \cdot x^{-18}
\end{smallmatrix}
\right) \\[1em]
g(x) \approx &\mathop{} \dfrac{1}{x^2} \cdot \left(\begin{smallmatrix}
1 & + 8.1359520115168615 \cdot 10^2 \cdot x^{-2}
& + 2.35239181626478200 \cdot 10^5 \cdot x^{-4}
& + 3.12557570795778731 \cdot 10^7 \cdot x^{-6} \\
& + 2.06297595146763354 \cdot 10^9 \cdot x^{-8}
& + 6.83052205423625007 \cdot 10^{10} \cdot x^{-10}
& + 1.09049528450362786 \cdot 10^{12} \cdot x^{-12} \\
& + 7.57664583257834349 \cdot 10^{12} \cdot x^{-14}
& + 1.81004487464664575 \cdot 10^{13} \cdot x^{-16}
& + 6.43291613143049485 \cdot 10^{12} \cdot x^{-18} \\
& - 1.36517137670871689 \cdot 10^{12} \cdot x^{-20} \\ \hline
1 & + 8.19595201151451564 \cdot 10^2 \cdot x^{-2}
& + 2.40036752835578777 \cdot 10^5 \cdot x^{-4}
& + 3.26026661647090822 \cdot 10^7 \cdot x^{-6} \\
& + 2.23355543278099360 \cdot 10^9 \cdot x^{-8}
& + 7.87465017341829930 \cdot 10^{10} \cdot x^{-10}
& + 1.39866710696414565 \cdot 10^{12} \cdot x^{-12} \\
& + 1.17164723371736605 \cdot 10^{13} \cdot x^{-14}
& + 4.01839087307656620 \cdot 10^{13} \cdot x^{-16}
& + 3.99653257887490811 \cdot 10^{13} \cdot x^{-18}
\end{smallmatrix}\right)
\end{align}$$

== See also ==
- Exponential integral
- Logarithmic integral
- Tanc function
- Tanhc function
- Sinhc function
- Coshc function
