= Algebraic function =

Mathematical function

In mathematics, an algebraic function is a function that satisfies a polynomial equation. Thus an equation of the following form holds:
$$a_n(x)f(x)^n + a_{n-1}(x)f(x)^{n-1} + \cdots + a_1(x)f(x) + a_0(x) = 0$$
where the $a_k(x)$ are polynomials (not all zero). Basic examples of algebraic functions are polynomial functions, rational functions, the nth root function, and functions obtained from these by composition and algebraic operations (addition, multiplication, subtraction, and division). Thus an example of an algebraic function is the function $f(x) = \sqrt{1-x^2}$ (for $-1<x<1$), whose graph is the top half of the standard unit circle. This function satisfies $x^2+f(x)^2-1=0$. Algebraic functions are contrasted with transcendental functions, such as the exponential function, logarithm, and the trigonometric functions.

Algebraic functions are usually treated more generally as multivalued functions. The example of $x^2+y^2-1=0$ illustrates this, since it includes both the top semicircle $y=\sqrt{1-x^2}$ and bottom semicircle $y=-\sqrt{1-x^2}$ in the same package. Algebraic functions are most often studied over the complex numbers. Formally, an algebraic function over the complex numbers is defined to be a multivalued function $y$ satisfying a polynomial equation
$$P(x,y) = 0$$
where $P(x,y)$ is an irreducible polynomial of two variables, having positive degree in $y$ and complex coefficients. The example of $x^2+y^2-1=0$ can be expressed as having the two single-valued branches, $y=\sqrt{1-x^2}$ and $y=-\sqrt{1-x^2}$, with branch points where the two branches come together, at $x=\pm 1$. This particular function can be written using finitely many algebraic operations and extraction of nth roots, but this is not generally the case such as with the Bring radical. Over the complex numbers, algebraic functions have local holomorphic branches away from finitely many branch points and poles, and are naturally studied as meromorphic functions on compact Riemann surfaces.

More generally, over a field $K$, an algebraic function in one variable $x$ is defined algebraically as an element algebraic over the rational function field $K(x)$. Equivalently, it satisfies a polynomial equation of positive degree in $y$,

$$a_n(x)y^n+a_{n-1}(x)y^{n-1}+\cdots+a_0(x)=0,$$

where the coefficients $a_i(x)$ are polynomials in $x$ with coefficients in $K$. If the irreducible defining polynomial has degree $n$ in $y$, the algebraic function is said to have degree $n$.

An algebraic function in $m$ variables over $K$ is an element algebraic over the field of rational functions $K(x_1,\ldots,x_m)$. Equivalently, it satisfies a polynomial equation

$$p(y,x_1,x_2,\dots,x_m)=0.$$

In one variable, algebraic functions are closely related to algebraic curves and their function fields; in the separable case, they may also be studied via finite or ramified covers of the projective line.

== Algebraic functions in one variable ==
=== Basic examples ===
Polynomial and rational functions are algebraic. A polynomial function $y=p(x)$ satisfies

$$y-p(x)=0.$$

A rational function $y=p(x)/q(x)$ satisfies

$$q(x)y-p(x)=0,$$

with poles at the zeros of $q$. More generally, the $n$th root of a polynomial or rational function is algebraic, since it satisfies an equation such as

$$y^n-p(x)=0.$$

Many elementary algebraic functions can be obtained from rational functions by algebraic operations and extraction of roots. However, algebraic functions are more general than functions expressible by radicals. By Galois theory, roots of a general polynomial equation of degree five or higher cannot be expressed by radicals.

Where a local inverse branch of an algebraic function exists, it is again algebraic. More generally, if $x$ and $y$ satisfy a polynomial relation $P(x,y)=0$, then interchanging the roles of $x$ and $y$ gives an algebraic correspondence whose branches include the local inverse branches. The solution set $P(x,y)=0$ is an algebraic curve; away from exceptional points, its local branches may be represented as graphs over the $x$-line.

=== The role of complex numbers ===
From an algebraic perspective, complex numbers enter quite naturally into the study of algebraic functions. First of all, by the fundamental theorem of algebra, the complex numbers are an algebraically closed field. Hence, for each value of $x$ for which $p(x,y)$ is a nonconstant polynomial of degree $n$ in $y$, the equation $p(x,y)=0$ has $n$ complex roots counted with multiplicity. Exceptional values of $x$, such as zeros of the leading coefficient or of the discriminant, are responsible for poles, multiple roots, and branch points.

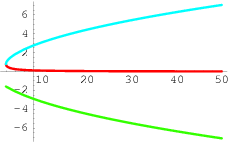
A graph of three branches of the algebraic function y, where y^{3} − xy + 1 = 0, over the domain 3/2^{2/3} < x < 50.

Furthermore, even if one is ultimately interested in real algebraic functions, there may be no means to express the function in terms of addition, multiplication, division and taking nth roots without resorting to complex numbers (see casus irreducibilis). For example, consider the algebraic function determined by the equation

$$y^3-xy+1=0.\,$$

Using the cubic formula, we get

$$y=-\frac{2x}{\sqrt[3]{-108+12\sqrt{81-12x^3}}}+\frac{\sqrt[3]{-108+12\sqrt{81-12x^3}}}{6}.$$

For $x\le \frac{3}{\sqrt[3]{4}},$ the square root is real and the cubic root is thus well defined, providing the unique real root. On the other hand, for $x>\frac{3}{\sqrt[3]{4}},$ the square root is not real, and one has to choose, for the square root, either non-real square root. Thus the cubic root has to be chosen among three non-real numbers. If the same choices are done in the two terms of the formula, the three choices for the cubic root provide the three branches shown, in the accompanying image.

It may be proven that there is no way to express this function in terms of nth roots using real numbers only, even though the resulting function is real-valued on the domain of the graph shown.

On a more significant theoretical level, using complex numbers allows one to use the powerful techniques of complex analysis to discuss algebraic functions. In particular, the argument principle can be used to show that any algebraic function is in fact an analytic function, at least in the multiple-valued sense.

Formally, let p(x, y) be a complex polynomial in the complex variables x and y. Suppose that x_{0} ∈ C is such that the polynomial p(x_{0}, y) of y has n distinct zeros. We shall show that the algebraic function is analytic in a neighborhood of x_{0}. Choose a system of n non-overlapping discs Δ_{i} containing each of these zeros. Then by the argument principle

$$\frac{1}{2\pi i}\oint_{\partial\Delta_i} \frac{p_y(x_0,y)}{p(x_0,y)}\,dy = 1.$$

By continuity, this also holds for all x in a neighborhood of x_{0}. In particular, p(x, y) has only one root in Δ_{i}, given by the residue theorem:

$$f_i(x) = \frac{1}{2\pi i}\oint_{\partial\Delta_i} y\frac{p_y(x,y)}{p(x,y)}\,dy$$

which is an analytic function.

=== Branch points and Puiseux series ===
At a critical value, the local branches need not be single-valued functions of $x$. Instead, after introducing a local parameter $t$ with $x-x_0=t^e$, the branches can be represented by convergent Puiseux series
$$y=\sum_{j=j_0}^{\infty} a_j t^j
=\sum_{j=j_0}^{\infty} a_j (x-x_0)^{j/e}.$$
The integer $e$ describes the ramification of the branch. Algebraic functions have no singularities other than poles and algebraic branch points.

=== Monodromy ===
Note that the foregoing proof of analyticity derived an expression for a system of n different function elements f_{i}(x), provided that x is not a critical value of the projection to the $x$-line. A critical value is a value of $x$ for which the number of distinct zeros of $p(x,y)$ is smaller than the degree of $p$ in $y$; this occurs only where the leading coefficient in $y$ or the discriminant vanishes. Hence there are only finitely many such values c_{1}, ..., c_{m}.

A close analysis of the properties of the function elements f_{i} near the critical values can be used to show that the monodromy cover is ramified over the critical values (and possibly the point at infinity). Thus the holomorphic extension of the f_{i} has at worst algebraic poles and ordinary algebraic branchings over the critical values.

Note that, away from the critical values, we have

$$p(x,y) = a_n(x)(y-f_1(x))(y-f_2(x))\cdots(y-f_n(x))$$

since the f_{i} are by definition the distinct zeros of p. Analytic continuation of the local branches around loops avoiding the critical values permutes the branches; these permutations form the monodromy group of the algebraic function. (The monodromy action on the universal covering space is related but different notion in the theory of Riemann surfaces.)

Algebraically, if $L$ is the splitting field of $p(x,y)$ over $\mathbb C(x)$, equivalently the Galois closure of the extension generated by one branch, then the Galois group $\operatorname{Gal}(L/\mathbb C(x))$ acts by permuting the roots $f_1,\ldots,f_n$. Under the correspondence between finite branched covers of the Riemann sphere and finite extensions of $\mathbb C(x)$, this Galois group is identified with the monodromy group of the covering. Thus the monodromy action realizes the Galois group of the splitting field as a permutation group on the branches.

== Closure properties ==
Algebraic functions are closed under addition, subtraction, multiplication, division, and composition, wherever the operations are defined. Algebraically, this follows from the fact that if $u$ and $v$ are algebraic over $K(x)$, then the field $K(x,u,v)$ is a finite algebraic extension of $K(x)$; hence any rational expression in $u$ and $v$ is again algebraic over $K(x)$. Similarly, if $f$ is algebraic over $K(x)$ and $g$ is algebraic over $K(t)$, then, under suitable interpretation of branches, $f(g(t))$ is again algebraic. Equivalently, if algebraic functions are regarded as algebraic correspondences on the projective line, the composite correspondence is again algebraic. If $P(x,y)=0$ and $Q(t,x)=0$ define two such correspondences, then their composite is contained in the algebraic relation obtained by eliminating $x$, for instance by the resultant

$\operatorname{Res}_x(Q(t,x),P(x,y))=0.$

On a nonsingular branch, the derivative of an algebraic function is also algebraic. Differentiating $P(x,y)=0$ implicitly gives

$$y'=-{P_x(x,y)\over P_y(x,y)},$$

where this expression is valid away from points at which $P_y=0$. By contrast, an antiderivative of an algebraic function need not be algebraic. Integrals of algebraic functions lead more generally to Abelian integrals, such as elliptic integrals.

== History ==
The ideas surrounding algebraic functions go back at least as far as René Descartes. The first discussion of algebraic functions appears to have been in Edward Waring's 1794 An Essay on the Principles of Human Knowledge in which he writes:

let a quantity denoting the ordinate, be an algebraic function of the abscissa x, by the common methods of division and extraction of roots, reduce it into an infinite series ascending or descending according to the dimensions of x, and then find the integral of each of the resulting terms.

== See also ==
- Algebraic expression
- Analytic function
- Complex analysis
- Elementary function
- Function (mathematics)
- Generalized function
- List of eponyms of special functions
- List of types of functions
- Polynomial
- Rational function
- Special functions
- Transcendental function
