= Trigonometric substitution =

Technique of integral evaluation

In mathematics, a trigonometric substitution replaces a trigonometric function with another expression. In calculus, trigonometric substitutions are a technique for evaluating integrals. In this case, a radical expression is replaced with a trigonometric one. Trigonometric identities may help simplify the answer.

In the case of a definite integral, this substitution changes the interval of integration. Alternatively, the antiderivative of the integrand may be applied to the original interval.

== Case I: Integrands containing a^{2} − x^{2} ==
Let $x = a \sin \theta,$ and use the identity $1-\sin^2 \theta = \cos^2 \theta.$

=== Examples of Case I ===
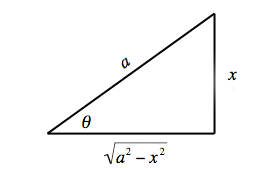
Geometric construction for Case I

==== Example 1 ====
In the integral

$$\int\frac{dx}{\sqrt{a^2-x^2}},$$

we may use

$$x=a\sin \theta,\quad dx=a\cos\theta\, d\theta, \quad \theta=\arcsin\frac{x}{a}.$$

Then,
$$\begin{align}
\int\frac{dx}{\sqrt{a^2-x^2}} &= \int\frac{a\cos\theta \,d\theta}{\sqrt{a^2-a^2\sin^2 \theta}} \\[6pt]
&= \int\frac{a\cos\theta\,d\theta}{\sqrt{a^2(1 - \sin^2 \theta )}} \\[6pt]
&= \int\frac{a\cos\theta\,d\theta}{\sqrt{a^2\cos^2\theta}} \\[6pt]
&= \int d\theta \\[6pt]
&= \theta + C \\[6pt]
&= \arcsin\frac{x}{a}+C.
\end{align}$$

The above step requires that $a > 0$ and $\cos \theta > 0.$ We can choose $a$ to be the principal root of $a^2,$ and impose the restriction $-\pi /2 < \theta < \pi /2$ by using the inverse sine function.

For a definite integral, one must figure out how the bounds of integration change. For example, as $x$ goes from $0$ to $a/2,$ then $\sin \theta$ goes from $0$ to $1/2,$ so $\theta$ goes from $0$ to $\pi / 6.$ Then,

$$\int_0^{a/2}\frac{dx}{\sqrt{a^2-x^2}}=\int_0^{\pi/6} d\theta = \frac{\pi}{6}.$$

Some care is needed when picking the bounds. Because integration above requires that $-\pi /2 < \theta < \pi /2$ , $\theta$ can only go from $0$ to $\pi / 6.$ Neglecting this restriction, one might have picked $\theta$ to go from $\pi$ to $5\pi /6,$ which would have resulted in the negative of the actual value.

Alternatively, fully evaluate the indefinite integrals before applying the boundary conditions. In that case, the antiderivative gives

$$\int_{0}^{a/2} \frac{dx}{\sqrt{a^2 - x^2}} = \arcsin \left( \frac{x}{a} \right) \Biggl|_{0}^{a/2}
= \arcsin \left ( \frac{1}{2}\right) - \arcsin (0) = \frac{\pi}{6}$$
as before.

==== Example 2 ====
The integral

$$\int\sqrt{a^2-x^2}\,dx,$$

may be evaluated by letting $x=a\sin \theta,\, dx=a\cos\theta\, d\theta,\, \theta=\arcsin\dfrac{x}{a},$ where $a > 0$ so that $\sqrt{a^2}=a,$ and $-\pi/2 \le \theta \le \pi/2$ by the range of arcsine, so that $\cos \theta \ge 0$ and $\sqrt{\cos^2 \theta} = \cos \theta.$

Then,
$$\begin{align}
\int\sqrt{a^2-x^2}\,dx &= \int\sqrt{a^2-a^2\sin^2\theta}\,(a\cos\theta) \,d\theta \\[6pt]
&= \int\sqrt{a^2(1-\sin^2\theta)}\,(a\cos\theta) \,d\theta \\[6pt]
&= \int\sqrt{a^2(\cos^2\theta)}\,(a\cos\theta) \,d\theta \\[6pt]
&= \int(a\cos\theta)(a\cos\theta) \,d\theta \\[6pt]
&= a^2\int\cos^2\theta\,d\theta \\[6pt]
&= a^2\int\left(\frac{1+\cos 2\theta}{2}\right)\,d\theta \\[6pt]
&= \frac{a^2}{2} \left(\theta+\frac{1}{2}\sin 2\theta \right) + C \\[6pt]
&= \frac{a^2}{2}(\theta+\sin\theta\cos\theta) + C \\[6pt]
&= \frac{a^2}{2}\left(\arcsin\frac{x}{a}+\frac{x}{a}\sqrt{1-\frac{x^2}{a^2}}\right) + C \\[6pt]
&= \frac{a^2}{2}\arcsin\frac{x}{a}+\frac{x}{2}\sqrt{a^2-x^2}+C.
\end{align}$$

For a definite integral, the bounds change once the substitution is performed and are determined using the equation $\theta = \arcsin\dfrac{x}{a},$ with values in the range $-\pi/2 \le \theta \le \pi/2.$ Alternatively, apply the boundary terms directly to the formula for the antiderivative.

For example, the definite integral

$$\int_{-1}^1\sqrt{4-x^2}\,dx,$$

may be evaluated by substituting $x = 2\sin\theta, \,dx = 2\cos\theta\,d\theta,$ with the bounds determined using $\theta = \arcsin\dfrac{x}{2}.$

Because $\arcsin(1/{2}) = \pi/6$ and $\arcsin(-1/2) = -\pi/6,$
$$\begin{align}
\int_{-1}^1\sqrt{4-x^2}\,dx &= \int_{-\pi/6}^{\pi/6}\sqrt{4-4\sin^2\theta}\,(2\cos\theta) \,d\theta \\[6pt]
&= \int_{-\pi/6}^{\pi/6}\sqrt{4(1-\sin^2\theta)}\,(2\cos\theta) \,d\theta \\[6pt]
&= \int_{-\pi/6}^{\pi/6}\sqrt{4(\cos^2\theta)}\,(2\cos\theta) \,d\theta \\[6pt]
&= \int_{-\pi/6}^{\pi/6}(2\cos\theta)(2\cos\theta) \,d\theta \\[6pt]
&= 4\int_{-\pi/6}^{\pi/6}\cos^2\theta\,d\theta \\[6pt]
&= 4\int_{-\pi/6}^{\pi/6}\left(\frac{1+\cos 2\theta}{2}\right)\,d\theta \\[6pt]
&= 2 \left[\theta+\frac{1}{2} \sin 2\theta \right]^{\pi/6}_{-\pi/6}
= [2\theta+\sin 2\theta] \Biggl |^{\pi/6}_{-\pi/6} \\[6pt]
&= \left(\frac{\pi}{3}+\sin\frac{\pi}{3}\right)-\left(-\frac{\pi}{3}+\sin\left(-\frac{\pi}{3}\right)\right)
= \frac{2\pi}{3}+\sqrt{3}.
\end{align}$$

On the other hand, direct application of the boundary terms to the previously obtained formula for the antiderivative yields
$$\begin{align}
\int_{-1}^1\sqrt{4-x^2}\,dx &= \left[ \frac{2^2}{2}\arcsin\frac{x}{2}+\frac{x}{2}\sqrt{2^2-x^2} \right]_{-1}^{1}\\[6pt]
&= \left( 2 \arcsin \frac{1}{2} + \frac{1}{2}\sqrt{4-1}\right) - \left( 2 \arcsin \left(-\frac{1}{2}\right) + \frac{-1}{2}\sqrt{4-1}\right)\\[6pt]
&= \left( 2 \cdot \frac{\pi}{6} + \frac{\sqrt{3}}{2}\right) - \left( 2\cdot \left(-\frac{\pi}{6}\right) - \frac{\sqrt 3}{2}\right)\\[6pt]
&= \frac{2\pi}{3} + \sqrt{3}
\end{align}$$
as before.

== Case II: Integrands containing a^{2} + x^{2} ==
Let $x = a \tan \theta,$ and use the identity $1+\tan^2 \theta = \sec^2 \theta.$

=== Examples of Case II ===
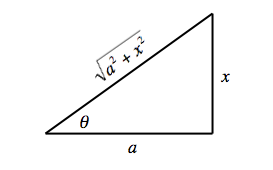
Geometric construction for Case II

==== Example 1 ====
In the integral

$$\int\frac{dx}{a^2+x^2}$$

we may write

$$x=a\tan\theta,\quad dx=a\sec^2\theta\, d\theta, \quad \theta=\arctan\frac{x}{a},$$

so that the integral becomes

$$\begin{align}
\int\frac{dx}{a^2+x^2} &= \int\frac{a\sec^2\theta\, d\theta}{a^2 + a^2\tan^2\theta} \\[6pt]
&= \int\frac{a\sec^2\theta\, d\theta}{a^2(1+\tan^2\theta)} \\[6pt]
&= \int\frac{a\sec^2\theta\, d\theta}{a^2\sec^2\theta} \\[6pt]
&= \int\frac{d\theta}{a} \\[6pt]
&= \frac{\theta}{a}+C \\[6pt]
&= \frac{1}{a} \arctan \frac{x}{a} + C,
\end{align}$$

provided $a \neq 0.$

For a definite integral, the bounds change once the substitution is performed and are determined using the equation $\theta = \arctan\frac{x}{a},$ with values in the range $-\frac{\pi}{2} < \theta < \frac{\pi}{2}.$ Alternatively, apply the boundary terms directly to the formula for the antiderivative.

For example, the definite integral

$$\int_0^1\frac{4\, dx}{1+x^2}\,$$

may be evaluated by substituting $x = \tan\theta, \,dx = \sec^2\theta\,d\theta,$ with the bounds determined using $\theta = \arctan x.$

Since $\arctan 0 = 0$ and $\arctan 1 = \pi/4,$
$$\begin{align}
\int_0^1\frac{4\,dx}{1+x^2} &= 4\int_0^1\frac{dx}{1 + x^2} \\[6pt]
&= 4\int_0^{\pi/4}\frac{\sec^2\theta\, d\theta}{1+\tan^2\theta} \\[6pt]
&= 4\int_0^{\pi/4}\frac{\sec^2\theta\, d\theta}{\sec^2\theta} \\[6pt]
&= 4\int_0^{\pi/4}d\theta \\[6pt]
&= (4\theta)\Bigg|^{\pi/4}_0 = 4 \left (\frac{\pi}{4} - 0 \right) = \pi.
\end{align}$$

Meanwhile, direct application of the boundary terms to the formula for the antiderivative yields
$$\begin{align}
\int_0^1\frac{4\,dx}{1+x^2}\,
&= 4\int_0^1\frac{dx}{1+x^2} \\[6pt]
&= 4\left[\frac{1}{1} \arctan \frac{x}{1} \right]^1_0 \\[6pt]
&= 4(\arctan x)\Bigg|^1_0 \\[6pt]
&= 4(\arctan 1 - \arctan 0) \\[6pt]
&= 4 \left (\frac{\pi}{4} - 0 \right) = \pi,
\end{align}$$
same as before.

==== Example 2 ====
The integral

$$\int\sqrt{a^2+x^2}\,{dx}$$

may be evaluated by letting $x=a\tan\theta,\, dx=a\sec^2\theta\, d\theta, \, \theta=\arctan\frac{x}{a},$

where $a > 0$ so that $\sqrt{a^2}=a,$ and $-\frac{\pi}{2}<\theta<\frac{\pi}{2}$ by the range of arctangent, so that $\sec \theta > 0$ and $\sqrt{\sec^2 \theta} = \sec \theta.$

Then,
$$\begin{align}
\int\sqrt{a^2+x^2}\,dx &= \int\sqrt{a^2 + a^2\tan^2\theta}\,(a \sec^2\theta)\, d\theta \\[6pt]
&= \int\sqrt{a^2 (1+\tan^2\theta)}\,(a \sec^2\theta)\, d\theta \\[6pt]
&= \int\sqrt{a^2 \sec^2\theta}\,(a \sec^2\theta)\, d\theta \\[6pt]
&= \int(a \sec\theta)(a \sec^2\theta)\, d\theta \\[6pt]
&= a^2\int \sec^3\theta\, d\theta. \\[6pt]
\end{align}$$
The integral of secant cubed may be evaluated using integration by parts. As a result,
$$\begin{align}
\int\sqrt{a^2+x^2}\,dx &= \frac{a^2}{2}(\sec\theta \tan\theta + \ln|\sec\theta+\tan\theta|)+C \\[6pt]
&= \frac{a^2}{2}\left(\sqrt{1+\frac{x^2}{a^2}}\cdot\frac{x}{a} + \ln\left|\sqrt{1+\frac{x^2}{a^2}}+\frac{x}{a}\right|\right)+C \\[6pt]
&= \frac{1}{2}\left(x\sqrt{a^2+x^2} + a^2\ln\left|\frac{x+\sqrt{a^2+x^2}}{a}\right|\right)+C.
\end{align}$$

To illustrate an application of this formula, suppose we wish to calculate the arc length of the parabola $y=x^2$ from $x=0$ and $x=2$. Denoting the arc length as $s$, we get

$$s = \int_{0}^{2} \sqrt{1 + (y')^2} dx = \int_{0}^{2} \sqrt{1 + 4x^2} dx = 2 \int_{0}^{2} \sqrt{\frac{1}{4} + x^2} dx.$$

In this instance, we have $a=\frac{1}{2}$, which gives

$$\begin{align}
s &= \left(x\sqrt{\frac{1}{4}+x^2} + \frac{1}{4}\ln\left|\frac{x+\sqrt{\frac{1}{4}+x^2}}{\frac{1}{2}}\right|\right)_{x=0}^{x=2} \\
&= 2\sqrt{\frac{17}{4}} + \frac{1}{4}\ln\left( 4 + 2\sqrt{\frac{17}{4}} \right) \\
&= \sqrt{17} + \frac{1}{4}\ln(4 + \sqrt{17}) \\
&\approx 4.64678 \\
\end{align}$$

== Case III: Integrands containing x^{2} − a^{2} ==
Let $x = a \sec \theta,$ and use the identity $\sec^2 \theta -1 = \tan^2 \theta.$

=== Examples of Case III ===
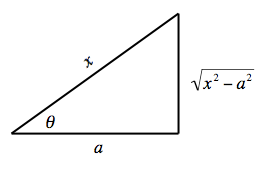
Geometric construction for Case III

Integrals such as

$$\int\frac{dx}{x^2 - a^2}$$

can also be evaluated by partial fractions rather than trigonometric substitutions. However, the integral

$$\int\sqrt{x^2 - a^2}\, dx$$

cannot. In this case, an appropriate substitution is:
$$x = a \sec\theta,\, dx = a \sec\theta\tan\theta\, d\theta, \, \theta = \arcsec\frac{x}{a},$$

where $a > 0$ so that $\sqrt{a^2}=a,$ and $0 \le \theta < \frac{\pi}{2}$ by assuming $x > 0,$ so that $\tan \theta \ge 0$ and $\sqrt{\tan^2 \theta} = \tan \theta.$

Then,
$$\begin{align}
\int\sqrt{x^2 - a^2}\, dx &= \int\sqrt{a^2 \sec^2\theta - a^2} \cdot a \sec\theta\tan\theta\, d\theta \\
&= \int\sqrt{a^2 (\sec^2\theta - 1)} \cdot a \sec\theta\tan\theta\, d\theta \\
&= \int\sqrt{a^2 \tan^2\theta} \cdot a \sec\theta\tan\theta\, d\theta \\
&= \int a^2 \sec\theta\tan^2\theta\, d\theta \\
&= a^2 \int (\sec\theta)(\sec^2\theta - 1)\, d\theta \\
&= a^2 \int (\sec^3\theta - \sec\theta)\, d\theta.
\end{align}$$

One may evaluate the integral of the secant function by multiplying the numerator and denominator by $( \sec \theta + \tan \theta)$ and the integral of secant cubed by parts. As a result,
$$\begin{align}
\int\sqrt{x^2-a^2}\,dx &= \frac{a^2}{2}(\sec\theta \tan\theta + \ln|\sec\theta+\tan\theta|)-a^2\ln|\sec\theta+\tan\theta|+C \\[6pt]
&= \frac{a^2}{2}(\sec\theta \tan\theta - \ln|\sec\theta+\tan\theta|)+C \\[6pt]
&= \frac{a^2}{2}\left(\frac{x}{a}\cdot\sqrt{\frac{x^2}{a^2}-1} - \ln\left|\frac{x}{a}+\sqrt{\frac{x^2}{a^2}-1}\right|\right)+C \\[6pt]
&= \frac{1}{2}\left(x\sqrt{x^2-a^2} - a^2\ln\left|\frac{x+\sqrt{x^2-a^2}}{a}\right|\right)+C.
\end{align}$$

When $\frac{\pi}{2} < \theta \le \pi,$ which happens when $x < 0$ given the range of arcsecant, $\tan \theta \le 0,$ meaning $\sqrt{\tan^2 \theta} = -\tan \theta$ instead in that case.

== Substitutions that eliminate trigonometric functions ==
Substitution can be used to remove trigonometric functions.

For instance,

$$\begin{align}
\int f(\sin(x), \cos(x))\, dx &=\int\frac1{\pm\sqrt{1-u^2}} f\left(u,\pm\sqrt{1-u^2}\right)\, du &&  u=\sin (x) \\[6pt]
\int f(\sin(x), \cos(x))\, dx &=\int\frac{1}{\mp\sqrt{1-u^2}} f\left(\pm\sqrt{1-u^2},u\right)\, du && u=\cos (x) \\[6pt]
\int f(\sin(x), \cos(x))\, dx &=\int\frac2{1+u^2} f \left(\frac{2u}{1+u^2},\frac{1-u^2}{1+u^2}\right)\, du &&  u=\tan\left (\frac{x}{2} \right ) \\[6pt]
\end{align}$$

The last substitution is known as the Weierstrass substitution, which makes use of tangent half-angle formulas.

For example,

$$\begin{align}
\int\frac{4 \cos x}{(1+\cos x)^3}\, dx &= \int\frac2{1+u^2}\frac{4\left(\frac{1-u^2}{1+u^2}\right)}{\left(1+\frac{1-u^2}{1+u^2}\right)^3}\, du = \int (1-u^2)(1+u^2)\, du \\&= \int (1-u^4)\,du = u - \frac{u^5}{5} + C = \tan \frac{x}{2} - \frac{1}{5} \tan^5 \frac{x}{2} + C.
\end{align}$$

== Hyperbolic substitution ==
Substitutions of hyperbolic functions can also be used to simplify integrals.

For example, to integrate $1/\sqrt{a^2+x^2}$, introduce the substitution $x=a\sinh{u}$ (and hence $dx=a\cosh u \,du$), then use the identity $\cosh^2 (x) - \sinh^2 (x) = 1$ to find:

$$\begin{align}
\int \frac{dx}{\sqrt{a^2+x^2}} &= \int \frac{a\cosh u \,du}{\sqrt{a^2+a^2\sinh^2 u}} \\[6pt]
&=\int \frac{\cosh{u} \,du}{\sqrt{1+\sinh^2{u}}} \\[6pt]
&=\int \frac{\cosh{u}}{\cosh u} \,du \\[6pt]
&=u+C \\[6pt]
&=\sinh^{-1}{\frac{x}{a}} + C.
\end{align}$$

If desired, this result may be further transformed using other identities, such as using the relation $\sinh^{-1}{z} = \operatorname{arsinh}{z} = \ln(z + \sqrt{z^2 + 1})$:
$$\begin{align}
\sinh^{-1}{\frac{x}{a}} + C
&=\ln\left(\frac{x}{a} + \sqrt{\frac{x^2}{a^2} + 1}\,\right) + C \\[6pt]
&=\ln\left(\frac{x + \sqrt{x^2+a^2}}{a}\,\right) + C.
\end{align}$$

== See also ==
- Weierstrass substitution
- Euler substitution
