= Integral of secant cubed =

Commonly encountered and tricky integral

The integral of secant cubed is a frequent and challenging indefinite integral of elementary calculus. Integral of sec³x is as follows:

$$\begin{align}
\int \sec^3 x \, dx
&= \tfrac12\frac{d}{dx}\sec x + \tfrac12 \int \sec x\, dx + C \\[6mu]
&= \tfrac12\sec x \tan x + \tfrac12 \int \sec x\, dx + C \\[6mu]
&= \tfrac12(\sec x \tan x + \ln \left|\sec x + \tan x\right|) + C \\[6mu]
&= \tfrac12(\sec x \tan x + \operatorname{gd}^{-1} x) + C, \qquad |x| < \tfrac12\pi
\end{align}$$

where $\operatorname{gd}^{-1}$ is the inverse Gudermannian function, the integral of the secant function.

There are a number of reasons why this particular antiderivative is worthy of special attention:

- The technique used for reducing integrals of higher odd powers of secant to lower ones is fully present in this, the simplest case. The other cases are done in the same way.
- The utility of hyperbolic functions in integration can be demonstrated in cases of odd powers of secant (powers of tangent can also be included).
- This is one of several integrals usually done in a first-year calculus course in which the most natural way to proceed involves integrating by parts and returning to the same integral one started with (another is the integral of the product of an exponential function with a sine or cosine function; yet another the integral of a power of the sine or cosine function).
- This integral is used in evaluating any integral of the form

$$\int \sqrt{a^2+x^2}\,dx,$$

where $a$ is a constant. In particular, it appears in the problems of:

- rectifying the parabola and the Archimedean spiral
- finding the surface area of the helicoid.

== Derivations ==
=== Integration by parts ===
This antiderivative may be found by integration by parts, as follows:

$$\int \sec^3 x \, dx = \int u\,dv = uv - \int v \,du$$

where

$$u = \sec x,\quad dv = \sec^2 x\,dx,\quad v
= \tan x,\quad du = \sec x \tan x\,dx.$$

Then

$$\begin{align}
\int \sec^3 x \, dx
&= \int (\sec x)(\sec^2 x)\,dx \\
&= \sec x \tan x - \int \tan x\,(\sec x \tan x)\,dx \\
&= \sec x \tan x - \int \sec x \tan^2 x\,dx \\
&= \sec x \tan x - \int \sec x\, (\sec^2 x - 1)\,dx \\
&= \sec x \tan x - \left(\int \sec^3 x \, dx - \int \sec x\,dx\right) \\
&= \sec x \tan x - \int \sec^3 x \, dx + \int \sec x\,dx.
\end{align}$$

Next add $\int\sec^3 x \,dx$ to both sides: (Note: The constants of integration are absorbed in the remaining integral term.)

$$\begin{align}
2 \int \sec^3 x \, dx
&= \sec x \tan x + \int \sec x\,dx \\
&= \sec x \tan x + \ln\left|\sec x + \tan x\right| + C,
\end{align}$$

using the integral of the secant function, $\int \sec x \,dx = \ln \left|\sec x + \tan x\right| + C.$

Finally, divide both sides by 2:

$$\int \sec^3 x \, dx
= \tfrac12(\sec x \tan x + \ln \left|\sec x + \tan x\right|) + C,$$

which was to be derived.

=== Reduction to an integral of a rational function ===
$$\int \sec^3 x \, dx
= \int \frac{dx}{\cos^3 x}
= \int \frac{\cos x\,dx}{\cos^4 x}
= \int \frac{\cos x\,dx}{(1-\sin^2 x)^2}
= \int \frac{du}{(1-u^2)^2}$$

where $u = \sin x$, so that $du = \cos x\,dx$. This admits a decomposition by partial fractions:

$$\frac{1}{(1-u^2)^2}
= \frac{1}{(1+u)^2(1-u)^2}
= \frac{1}{4(1+u)} + \frac{1}{4(1+u)^2} + \frac{1}{4(1-u)} + \frac{1}{4(1-u)^2}.$$

Antidifferentiating term-by-term, one gets

$$\begin{align}
\int \sec^3 x \, dx
&= \tfrac14 \ln |1+u| - \frac{1}{4(1+u)} - \tfrac14 \ln|1-u| + \frac{1}{4(1-u)} + C \\[6pt]
&= \tfrac14 \ln \Biggl| \frac{1+u}{1-u} \Biggr|              + \frac{u}{2(1-u^2)} + C \\[6pt]
&= \tfrac14 \ln \Biggl|\frac{1+\sin x}{1-\sin x} \Biggr|     + \frac{\sin x}{2\cos^2 x} + C\\[6pt]
&= \tfrac14 \ln \left|\frac{1+\sin x}{1-\sin x}\right|       + \tfrac12 \sec x \tan x + C \\[6pt]
&= \tfrac14 \ln \left|\frac{(1+\sin x)^2}{1-\sin^2 x}\right| + \tfrac12 \sec x \tan x + C \\[6pt]
&= \tfrac14 \ln \left|\frac{(1+\sin x)^2}{\cos^2 x}\right|   + \tfrac12 \sec x \tan x + C \\[6pt]
&= \tfrac12 \ln \left|\frac{1+\sin x}{\cos x}\right|         + \tfrac12 \sec x \tan x + C \\[6pt]
&= \tfrac12 (\ln\left|\sec x + \tan x\right| + \sec x \tan x) + C.
\end{align}$$

Alternatively, one may use the tangent half-angle substitution for any rational function of trigonometric functions; for this particular integrand, that method leads to the integration of

$$\frac{2(1+u^2)^2}{(1-u^2)^3}
= \frac{1}{2(1+u)} - \frac{1}{2(1+u)^2} + \frac{1}{(1+u)^3} + \frac{1}{2(1-u)} - \frac{1}{2(1-u)^2} + \frac{1}{(1-u)^3}.$$

=== Hyperbolic functions ===
Integrals of the form: $\int \sec^n x \tan^m x\, dx$ can be reduced using the Pythagorean identity if $n$ is even or $n$ and $m$ are both odd. If $n$ is odd and $m$ is even, hyperbolic substitutions can be used to replace the nested integration by parts with hyperbolic power-reducing formulas.

$$\begin{align}
\sec x &= \cosh u \\[6pt]
\tan x &= \sinh u \\[6pt]
\sec^2 x \, dx &= \cosh u \, du \text{ or } \sec x \tan x\, dx = \sinh u \, du \\[6pt]
\sec x \, dx &= \, du \text{ or } dx = \operatorname{sech} u \, du \\[6pt]
u &= \operatorname{arcosh} (\sec x ) = \operatorname{arsinh} ( \tan x ) = \ln|\sec x + \tan x|
\end{align}$$

Note that $\int \sec x \, dx = \ln|\sec x + \tan x|$ follows directly from this substitution.

$$\begin{align}
\int \sec^3 x \, dx
&= \int \cosh^2 u\,du \\[6pt]
&= \tfrac12 \int ( \cosh 2u +1) \,du \\[6pt]
&= \tfrac12 \left( \tfrac12 \sinh2u + u\right) + C\\[6pt]
&= \tfrac12 ( \sinh u \cosh u + u ) + C \\[6pt]
&= \tfrac12 (\sec x \tan x + \ln \left|\sec x + \tan x\right|) + C
\end{align}$$

== Higher odd powers of secant ==
Just as the integration by parts above reduced the integral of secant cubed to the integral of secant to the first power, so a similar process reduces the integral of higher odd powers of secant to lower ones. This is the secant reduction formula, which follows the syntax:

$$\int \sec^n x \, dx
= \frac{\sec^{n-2} x \tan x}{n-1} \,+\, \frac{n-2}{n-1}\int \sec^{n-2} x \, dx \qquad \text{ (for }n \ne 1\text{)}\,\!$$

Even powers of tangents can be accommodated by using binomial expansion to form an odd polynomial of secant and using these formulae on the largest term and combining like terms.

== See also ==
- Lists of integrals
