= Christoph Gudermann =

German mathematician (1798–1852)

- Born: 25 March 1798; Vienenburg, Holy Roman Empire
- Died: 25 September 1852 (aged 54); Münster, Province of Westphalia, Kingdom of Prussia
- Education: University of Göttingen
- Known for: Gudermannian function Uniform convergence
- Awards: PhD (Hon): University of Berlin (1832)
- Scientific career
- Fields: Mathematician
- Workplaces: Münster Academy
- Academic advisors: Carl Gauss
- Notable students: Karl Weierstrass

Christoph Gudermann (25 March 1798 – 25 September 1852) was a German mathematician noted for introducing the Gudermannian function and the concept of uniform convergence, and for being the teacher of Karl Weierstrass, who was greatly influenced by Gudermann's course on elliptic functions in 1839–1840, the first such course to be taught in any institute.

== Biography ==
Gudermann was born in Vienenburg. He was the son of a school teacher and became a teacher himself after studying at the University of Göttingen. He began his teaching career in Kleve and then transferred to a school in Münster.

Gudermann introduced the concept of uniform convergence in an 1838 paper on elliptic functions, but only observed it informally, neither formalizing it nor using it in his proofs. Instead, Weierstrass elaborated and applied uniform convergence.

His researches into spherical geometry and special functions focused on particular cases, so that he did not receive the credit given to those who published more general works. The Gudermannian function, or hyperbolic amplitude, is named after him.

Gudermann died in Münster.
