= Euler substitution =

Method of integration for rational functions

Euler substitution is a method for evaluating integrals of the form

$$\int R(x, \sqrt{ax^2 + bx + c}) \,  dx,$$

where $R$ is a rational function of $x$ and $\sqrt{ax^2 + bx + c}$. It is proved that these integrals can always be rationalized using one of three Euler substitutions.

== Euler's first substitution ==
The first substitution of Euler is used when $a > 0$. We substitute
$$\sqrt{ax^2 + bx + c} = \pm x\sqrt{a} + t$$
and solve the resulting expression for $x$. We have that $x = \frac{c - t^2}{\pm 2t\sqrt{a} - b}$ and that the $dx$ term is expressible rationally in $t$.

In this substitution, either the positive sign or the negative sign can be chosen.

== Euler's second substitution ==
If $c > 0$, we take
$$\sqrt{ax^2 + bx + c} = xt \pm \sqrt{c}.$$
We solve for $x$ similarly as above and find
$$x = \frac{\pm 2t\sqrt{c} - b}{a - t^2}.$$

Again, either the positive or the negative sign can be chosen.

== Euler's third substitution ==
If the polynomial $ax^2 + bx + c$ has real roots $\alpha$ and $\beta$, we may choose $\sqrt{ax^2 + bx + c} = \sqrt{a(x - \alpha)(x - \beta)} = (x - \alpha)t$. This yields $x = \frac{a\beta - \alpha t^2}{a - t^2},$ and as in the preceding cases, we can express the entire integrand rationally in $t$.

== Examples ==
=== Examples for Euler's first substitution ===
==== First example ====
For the integral $\int\! \frac{\ dx}{\sqrt{x^2+c}}$, we can use the first substitution and set $\sqrt{x^2+c} = -x+t$. Thus,
$$x = \frac{t^2-c}{2t}, \qquad \ dx = \frac{t^2+c}{2t^2}\,\ dt,$$
$$\sqrt{x^2+c} = -\frac{t^2-c}{2t}+t = \frac{t^2+c}{2t}.$$
Accordingly, we obtain:
$$\int \frac{dx}{\sqrt{x^2+c}}
= \int \frac{\frac{t^2+c}{2t^2}}{\frac{t^2+c}{2t}}\, \ dt
= \int \frac{dt}{t}
= \ln|t|+C
= \ln\left|x+\sqrt{x^2+c}\right|+C.$$

The cases $c = \pm 1$ give the formulas
$$\begin{align}
\int \frac{\ dx}{\sqrt{x^2+1}} &= \operatorname{arsinh}(x) + C,  \\[6pt]
\int \frac{\ dx}{\sqrt{x^2-1}} &= \operatorname{arcosh}(x) + C. \qquad (x > 1)
\end{align}$$

==== Second example ====
For finding the value of
$$\int\frac{1}{x\sqrt{x^{2}+4x-4}}dx,$$
we find $t$ using the first substitution of Euler: $\sqrt{x^{2}+4x-4} = \sqrt{1}x+t = x+t$. Squaring both sides of the equation gives us $x^{2}+4x-4 = x^{2} + 2xt +t^{2}$, from which the $x^2$ terms will cancel out. Solving for $x$ yields
$$x=\frac{t^{2}+4}{4-2t}.$$

From there, we find that the differentials $dx$ and $dt$ are related by $dx=\frac{-2t^{2}+8t+8}{(4-2t)^{2}}dt.$

Hence,
$$\begin{align}
\int \frac{dx}{x\sqrt{x^{2}+4x-4}}
&= \int \frac{\frac{-2t^{2}+8t+8}{(4-2t)^{2}}}{\left(\frac{t^{2}+4}{4-2t}\right)\left(\frac{-t^{2}+4t+4}{4-2t}\right)}dt
&& t=\sqrt{x^{2}+4x-4}-x \\[6pt]
&= 2\int \frac{dt}{t^{2}+4}= \tan^{-1}\left(\frac t2\right) +C\\[6pt]
&= \tan^{-1}\left(\frac{\sqrt{x^{2}+4x-4}-x}{2}\right)+C.
\end{align}$$

=== Examples for Euler's second substitution ===
In the integral
$$\int\! \frac{dx}{x\sqrt{-x^2+x+2}},$$
we can use the second substitution and set $\sqrt{-x^2+x+2} = xt + \sqrt{2}$. Thus
$$x = \frac{1-2\sqrt{2}t}{t^2+1}, \qquad dx = \frac{2\sqrt{2}t^2-2t-2\sqrt{2}}{(t^2+1)^2} dt,$$
and
$$\sqrt{-x^2+x+2} = \frac{1-2\sqrt{2}t}{t^2+1}t + \sqrt{2} = \frac{-\sqrt{2}t^2+t+\sqrt{2}}{t^2+1}.$$

Accordingly, we obtain:
$$\begin{align}
\int \frac{  dx}{x\sqrt{-x^2+x+2}} &= \int \frac{\frac{2\sqrt{2}t^2-2t-2\sqrt{2}}{(t^2+1)^2}}{\frac{1-2\sqrt{2}t}{t^2+1}\frac{-\sqrt{2}t^2+t+\sqrt{2}}{t^2+1}}   dt \\[6pt]
&= \int\!\frac{-2}{-2\sqrt{2}t+1}  dt = \frac{1}{\sqrt{2}}\int\frac{-2\sqrt{2}}{-2\sqrt{2}t+1}  dt  \\[6pt]
&= \frac{1}{\sqrt{2}}\ln \left|2\sqrt{2}t-1 \right|+C \\[4pt]
&= \frac{\sqrt{2}}{2}\ln \left|2\sqrt{2}\frac{\sqrt{-x^2+x+2}-\sqrt{2}}{x}-1 \right|+C.
\end{align}$$

=== Examples for Euler's third substitution ===
To evaluate
$$\int\! \frac{x^2}{\sqrt{-x^2+3x-2}}\ dx,$$
we can use the third substitution and set $\sqrt{-(x-2)(x-1)} = (x-2)t$. Thus
$$x = \frac{-2t^2-1}{-t^2-1}, \qquad \ dx = \frac{2t}{(-t^2-1)^2}\,\ dt,$$
and
$$\sqrt{-x^2+3x-2} = (x-2)t = \frac{t}{-t^2-1.}.$$

Next,
$$\int \frac{x^2}{\sqrt{-x^2+3x-2}}\ dx = \int\frac{\left(\frac{-2t^2-1}{-t^2-1}\right)^2\frac{2t}{(-t^2-1)^2}}{\frac{t}{-t^2-1}}\ dt = \int\frac{2(-2t^2-1)^2}{(-t^2-1)^3}\ dt.$$
This is a rational function, which can be solved using partial fractions.

== Generalizations ==
The substitutions of Euler can be generalized by allowing the use of imaginary numbers. For example, in the integral $\int \frac{dx}{\sqrt{-x^2 + c}}$, the substitution $\sqrt{-x^2 + c} = \pm ix + t$ can be used. Extensions to the complex numbers allows us to use every type of Euler substitution regardless of the coefficients on the quadratic.

The substitutions of Euler can be generalized to a larger class of functions. Consider integrals of the form
$$\int R_1 \left(x, \sqrt{ax^2 + bx + c} \right) \, \log\left(R_2\left(x, \sqrt{ax^2 + bx + c}\right)\right) \,  dx,$$
where $R_1$ and $R_2$ are rational functions of $x$ and $\sqrt{ax^2 + bx + c}$. This integral can be transformed by the substitution $\sqrt{ax^2 + bx + c} = \sqrt{a} + xt$ into another integral
$$\int \tilde R_1(t) \log\big(\tilde R_2(t)\big) \,  dt,$$
where $\tilde R_1(t)$ and $\tilde R_2(t)$ are now simply rational functions of $t$. In principle, factorization and partial fraction decomposition can be employed to break the integral down into simple terms, which can be integrated analytically through use of the dilogarithm function.

== See also ==
- Integration by substitution
- Trigonometric substitution
- Weierstrass substitution
