= Integral of the secant function =

Antiderivative of the secant function

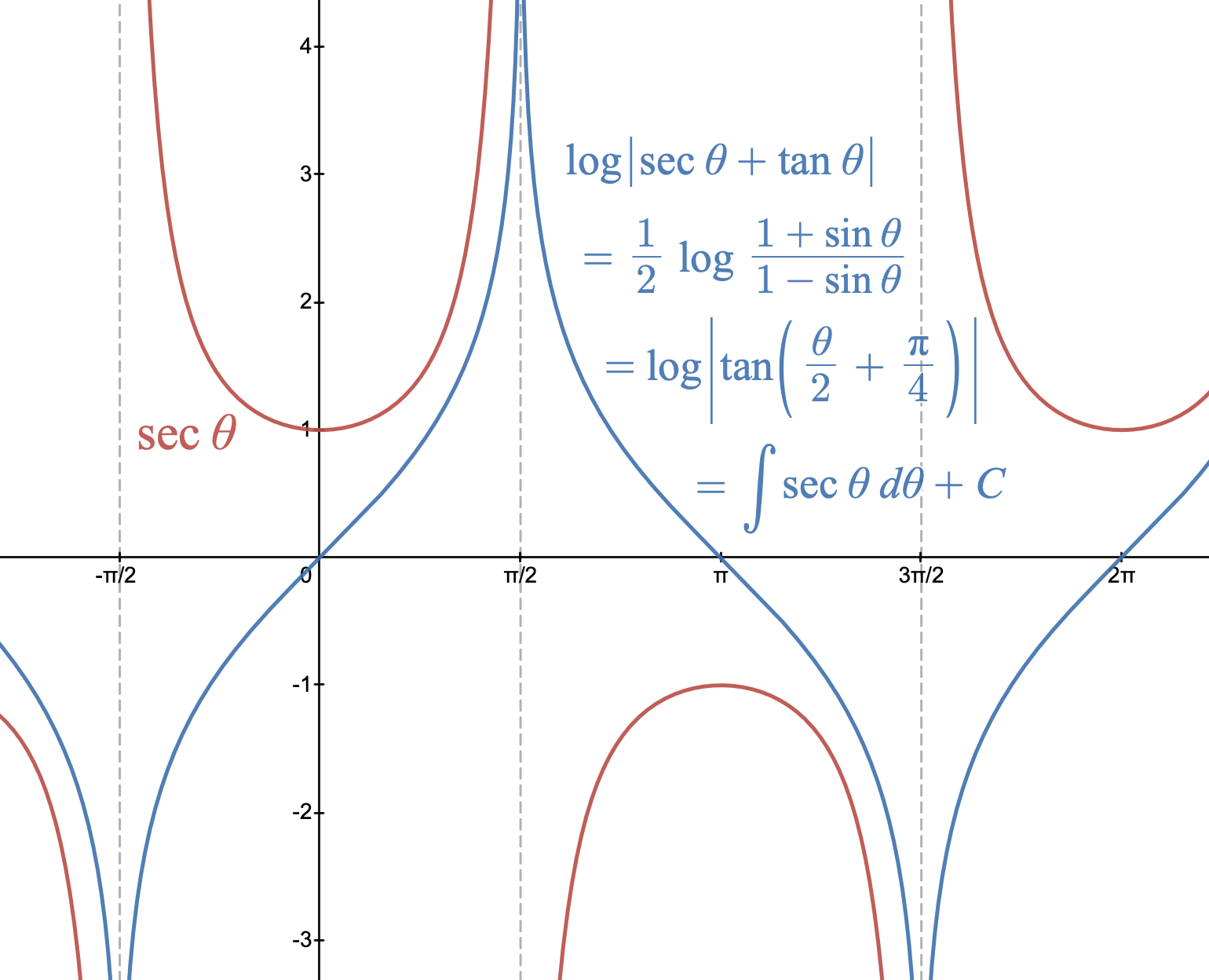
A graph of the secant function (red) and its antiderivative (blue)

In calculus, the integral of the secant function can be evaluated using a variety of methods and there are multiple ways of expressing the antiderivative, all of which can be shown to be equivalent via trigonometric identities,

$$\int \sec \theta \, d\theta = \begin{cases}
\dfrac12 \ln \dfrac{1+\sin\theta}{1-\sin\theta} + C \\[15mu]
\ln{\bigl|\sec\theta + \tan\theta\,\bigr|} + C \\[15mu]
\ln{\left|\,{\tan}\biggl(\dfrac\theta2 + \dfrac\pi4\biggr) \right|} + C
\end{cases}$$

This formula is useful for evaluating various trigonometric integrals. In particular, it can be used to evaluate the integral of the secant cubed, which, though seemingly special, comes up rather frequently in applications.

The definite integral of the secant function starting from $0$ is the inverse Gudermannian function, $\operatorname{gd}^{-1}.$ For numerical applications, all of the above expressions result in loss of significance for some arguments. An alternative expression in terms of the inverse hyperbolic sine arsinh is numerically well behaved for real arguments $|\phi| < \tfrac12\pi$:

$$\operatorname{gd}^{-1}\phi = \int_0^\phi \sec \theta \, d\theta
= \operatorname{arsinh}(\tan \phi).$$

The integral of the secant function was historically one of the first integrals of its type ever evaluated, before most of the development of integral calculus. It is important because it is the vertical coordinate of the Mercator projection, used for marine navigation with constant compass bearing.

== Proof that the different antiderivatives are equivalent ==
=== Trigonometric forms ===
Three common expressions for the integral of the secant,

$$\begin{align}
\int \sec \theta \, d\theta
&= \dfrac12 \ln \dfrac{1+\sin\theta}{1-\sin\theta} + C \\[5mu]
&= \ln{\bigl|\sec\theta + \tan\theta\,\bigr|} + C \\[5mu]
&= \ln{\left|\,{\tan}\biggl(\frac\theta2 + \frac\pi4\biggr) \right|} + C,
\end{align}$$

are equivalent because

$$\sqrt{\dfrac{1+\sin\theta}{1-\sin\theta}}
= \bigl|\sec\theta + \tan\theta\,\bigr|
= \left|\,{\tan}\biggl(\frac\theta2 + \frac\pi4\biggr) \right|.$$

Proof: we can separately apply the tangent half-angle substitution $t = \tan\tfrac12 \theta$ to each of the three forms, and show them equivalent to the same expression in terms of $t.$ Under this substitution $\cos \theta = (1 - t^2)\big/(1 + t^2)$ and $\sin \theta = 2t \big/(1 + t^2).$

First,

$$\begin{align}
\sqrt{\dfrac{1+\sin\theta}{1-\sin\theta}}
&= \sqrt{\frac{1 + \dfrac{2t}{1 + t^2}}{1 - \dfrac{2t}{1 + t^2}}}
= \sqrt{\frac{1 + t^2 + 2t}{1 + t^2 - 2t}}
= \sqrt{\frac{(1 + t)^2}{(1 - t)^2}} \\[5mu]
&= \left|\frac{1 + t}{1 - t}\right|.
\end{align}$$

Second,

$$\begin{align}
\bigl|\sec\theta + \tan\theta\,\bigr|
&= \left|\frac1{\cos\theta} + \frac{\sin\theta}{\cos\theta}\right|
= \left|\frac{1 + t^2}{1 - t^2} + \frac{2t}{1 - t^2}\right|
= \left|\frac{(1 + t)^2}{(1 + t)(1 - t)}\right| \\[5mu]
&= \left|\frac{1 + t}{1 - t}\right|.
\end{align}$$

Third, using the tangent addition identity $\tan(\phi + \psi) = (\tan\phi + \tan\psi) \big/ (1 - \tan\phi\,\tan\psi),$

$$\begin{align}
\left|\,{\tan}\biggl(\frac\theta2 + \frac\pi4\biggr) \right|
&= \left|\frac{\tan\tfrac12 \theta + \tan\tfrac14\pi}{1 - \tan\tfrac12 \theta \, \tan\tfrac14\pi} \right|
= \left|\frac{t + 1}{1 - t \cdot 1}\right| \\[5mu]
&= \left|\frac{1 + t}{1 - t}\right|.
\end{align}$$

So all three expressions describe the same quantity.

The conventional solution for the Mercator projection ordinate may be written without the absolute value signs since the latitude $\varphi$ lies between $-\tfrac12\pi$ and $\tfrac12\pi$,

$$y = \ln\,{\tan}\biggl(\frac\varphi2 + \frac\pi4\biggr).$$

=== Hyperbolic forms ===
Let

$$\begin{align}
\psi      &=\ln(\sec\theta+\tan\theta),\\[4pt]
e^\psi    &=\sec\theta+\tan\theta,\\[4pt]
\sinh\psi   &=\frac{e^\psi-e^{-\psi}}{2}=\tan\theta,\\[4pt]
\cosh\psi   &=\sqrt{1+\sinh^2\psi}= |\sec\theta\, |,\\[4pt]
\tanh\psi   &=\sin\theta.
\end{align}$$

Therefore,

$$\begin{align}
\int \sec \theta \, d\theta
&=\operatorname{artanh} \left(\sin\theta\right) + C \\[-2mu]
&=\sgn(\cos \theta)\operatorname{arsinh} \left( \tan \theta\right)+C \\[7mu]
&=\sgn(\sin \theta) \operatorname{arcosh}{ \left| \sec \theta\right|}+C.
\end{align}$$

== History ==
The integral of the secant function was one of the "outstanding open problems of the mid-seventeenth century", solved in 1668 by James Gregory. He applied his result to a problem concerning nautical tables. In 1599, Edward Wright evaluated the integral by numerical methods – what today we would call Riemann sums. He wanted the solution for the purposes of cartography – specifically for constructing an accurate Mercator projection. In the 1640s, Henry Bond, a teacher of navigation, surveying, and other mathematical topics, compared Wright's numerically computed table of values of the integral of the secant with a table of logarithms of the tangent function, and consequently conjectured that

$$\int_0^\varphi \sec\theta\,d\theta = \ln\tan\left(\frac{\varphi}{2} + \frac{\pi}{4}\right).$$

This conjecture became widely known, and in 1665, Isaac Newton was aware of it.

== Evaluations ==
=== By a standard substitution (Gregory's approach) ===
A standard method of evaluating the secant integral presented in various references involves multiplying the numerator and denominator by sec θ + tan θ and then using the substitution u = sec θ + tan θ. This substitution can be obtained from the derivatives of secant and tangent added together, which have secant as a common factor.

Starting with

$$\frac d{d\theta}\sec \theta = \sec\theta \tan\theta \quad \text{and} \quad \frac d{d\theta}\tan \theta = \sec^2 \theta,$$

adding them gives

$$\begin{align}
\frac d{d\theta}(\sec\theta + \tan\theta) &= \sec\theta \tan\theta + \sec^2\theta \\
&= \sec\theta (\tan\theta + \sec \theta).
\end{align}$$

The derivative of the sum is thus equal to the sum multiplied by sec θ. This enables multiplying sec θ by sec θ + tan θ in the numerator and denominator and performing the following substitutions:

$$\begin{align}
u &= \sec \theta + \tan \theta \\
du &= \left(\sec \theta \tan \theta + \sec^2 \theta\right)\,d\theta.
\end{align}$$

The integral is evaluated as follows:

$$\begin{align}
\int \sec \theta \,d\theta &= \int \frac{\sec\theta (\sec\theta + \tan\theta)}{\sec\theta + \tan\theta} \,d\theta \\[6pt]
&= \int \frac{\sec^2\theta + \sec\theta \tan\theta}{\sec\theta + \tan\theta}\,d\theta & u &= \sec\theta + \tan\theta \\[6pt]
&= \int \frac{1}{u}\,du & du &= \left(\sec\theta \tan\theta + \sec^2\theta\right) \,d\theta \\[6pt]
&= \ln |u| + C \\[4pt]
&= \ln |\sec\theta + \tan\theta| + C,
\end{align}$$

as claimed. This was the formula discovered by James Gregory.

=== By partial fractions and a substitution (Barrow's approach) ===
Although Gregory proved the conjecture in 1668 in his Exercitationes Geometricae, the proof was presented in a form that renders it nearly impossible for modern readers to comprehend; Isaac Barrow, in his Lectiones Geometricae of 1670, gave the first "intelligible" proof, though even that was "couched in the geometric idiom of the day." Barrow's proof of the result was the earliest use of partial fractions in integration. Adapted to modern notation, Barrow's proof began as follows:

$$\int \sec \theta \, d\theta
= \int \frac{1}{\cos\theta} \,d\theta
= \int \frac{\cos\theta }{\cos^2\theta}\, d\theta
= \int \frac{\cos\theta }{1 - \sin^2\theta} \, d\theta$$

Substituting u = sin θ, du = cos θ dθ, reduces the integral to

$$\begin{align}
\int \frac{1}{1 - u^2} \,du &= \int\frac{1}{(1+u)(1-u)} \,du \\[6pt]
&= \int \frac12 \!\left(\frac{1}{1+u} + \frac{1}{1-u}\right) du &&\text{partial fraction decomposition} \\[6pt]
&= \frac12 \bigl( \ln\left|1 + u\right|-\ln \left|1-u\right| \bigr) + C \\[6pt]
&= \frac12 \ln\left|\frac{1+u}{1-u}\right| + C
\end{align}$$

Therefore,

$$\int \sec \theta \,d\theta
= \frac{1}{2}\ln \frac{1 + \sin \theta}{1 - \sin \theta} + C,$$

as expected. Taking the absolute value is not necessary because $1 + \sin \theta$ and $1 - \sin \theta$ are always non-negative for real values of $\theta.$

=== By the tangent half-angle substitution ===
==== Standard ====
Under the tangent half-angle substitution $t = \tan\tfrac12\theta,$

$$\begin{align}
&\sin \theta = \frac{2t}{1 + t^2},\quad
\cos \theta = \frac{1 - t^2}{1 + t^2},\quad
d\theta = \frac{2}{1 + t^2}\,dt,
\\[10mu]
&\tan \theta = \frac{\sin\theta}{\cos\theta} = \frac{2t}{1 - t^2},\quad
\sec \theta = \frac1{\cos\theta} = \frac{1 + t^2}{1 - t^2},
\\[10mu]
&\sec \theta + \tan \theta = \frac{1 + 2t + t^2}{1 - t^2} = \frac{1 + t}{1 - t}.
\end{align}$$

Therefore the integral of the secant function is

$$\begin{align}
\int \sec \theta \,d\theta
&= \int \left( \frac{1 + t^2}{1 - t^2} \right)\!\left( \frac{2}{1 + t^2} \right) dt && t = \tan\frac{\theta}{2}\\[6pt]
&= \int \frac{2}{(1 - t) (1 + t)} \, dt \\[6pt]
&= \int \left( \frac{1}{1+t} + \frac{1}{1-t} \right) dt && \text{partial fraction decomposition} \\[6pt]
&= \ln|1+t| - \ln|1-t| + C \\[6pt]
&= \ln \left| \frac{1+t}{1-t}\right| + C\\[6pt]
&= \ln | \sec \theta + \tan \theta| + C,
\end{align}$$

as before.

==== Non-standard ====
The integral can also be derived by using a somewhat non-standard version of the tangent half-angle substitution, which is simpler in the case of this particular integral, published in 2013, is as follows:

$$\begin{align}
x &= \tan \left( \frac \pi 4 + \frac \theta 2 \right) \\[10pt]
\frac{2x}{1+x^2} &= \frac{2 \tan \left( \frac \pi 4 + \frac \theta 2 \right)}{\sec^2 \left( \frac \pi 4 + \frac \theta 2 \right)} = 2\sin \left( \frac \pi 4 + \frac \theta 2 \right) \cos \left( \frac \pi 4 + \frac \theta 2 \right)\\[6pt]
&=\sin \left(\frac{\pi}{2}+\theta \right)=\cos\theta &&\text{by the double-angle formula}\\[10pt]
dx&=\frac12 \sec^2 \left(\frac{\pi}{4}+\frac{\theta}{2}\right)d\theta=\frac12 \left(1+x^2\right) d\theta\\[10pt]
d\theta &=\frac{2}{1+x^2}\,dx.
\end{align}$$

Substituting:

$$\begin{align}
\int \sec\theta \, d\theta = \int \frac{1}{\cos\theta} \, d\theta & = \int \frac{1+x^2}{2x} \cdot \frac{2}{1+x^2} \,dx \\[6pt]
&= \int \frac{1}{x} \,dx \\[6pt]
&= \ln|x| + C \\[6pt]
&= \ln\left| \tan\left( \frac \pi 4 + \frac \theta 2 \right) \right| + C.
\end{align}$$

=== By two successive substitutions ===
The integral can also be solved by manipulating the integrand and substituting twice. Using the definition sec θ = 1/(cos θ) and the identity cos^{2} θ + sin^{2} θ = 1, the integral can be rewritten as

$$\int \sec \theta \, d\theta=\int \frac{1}{\cos \theta}\,d\theta = \int \frac{\cos \theta}{\cos^2 \theta}\,d\theta=\int \frac{\cos \theta}{1-\sin^2 \theta}\,d\theta.$$

Substituting u = sin θ, du = cos θ dθ reduces the integral to

$$\int \frac{1}{1-u^2} \, du.$$

The reduced integral can be evaluated by substituting u = tanh t, du = sech^{2} t dt, and then using the identity 1 − tanh^{2} t = sech^{2} t.

$$\int \frac{\operatorname{sech}^2 t}{1-\tanh^2 t}\,dt = \int \frac{\operatorname{sech}^2 t}{\operatorname{sech}^2 t} \, dt = \int dt.$$

The integral is now reduced to a simple integral, and back-substituting gives

$$\begin{align}
\int dt &= t+C \\
&=\operatorname{artanh} u+C \\[4pt]
&=\operatorname{artanh}(\sin \theta)+C,
\end{align}$$

which is one of the hyperbolic forms of the integral.

A similar strategy can be used to integrate the cosecant, hyperbolic secant, and hyperbolic cosecant functions.

=== Other hyperbolic forms ===
It is also possible to find the other two hyperbolic forms directly, by again multiplying and dividing by a convenient term:

$$\int \sec \theta \,d\theta=\int \frac{\sec^2 \theta}{\sec \theta} \,d\theta=\int \frac{\sec^2 \theta}{\pm\sqrt{1+\tan^2 \theta}} \,d\theta,$$

where $\pm$ stands for $\sgn(\cos \theta)$ because $\sqrt{1+\tan^2 \theta} = |\sec\theta\,|.$ Substituting u = tan θ, du = sec^{2} θ dθ, reduces to a standard integral:

$$\begin{align}
\int \frac{1}{\pm\sqrt{1+u^2}} \,du
&=\pm\operatorname{arsinh} u+C \\
&=\sgn(\cos \theta)\operatorname{arsinh} \left( \tan \theta\right)+C,
\end{align}$$

where sgn is the sign function.

Likewise:

$$\int \sec \theta \,d\theta =\int \frac{\sec \theta \tan \theta}{\tan \theta} \,d\theta=\int \frac{\sec \theta \tan \theta}{\pm\sqrt{\sec^2 \theta-1}} \,d\theta.$$

Substituting u = |sec θ|, du = |sec θ| tan θ dθ, reduces to a standard integral:

$$\begin{align}
\int \frac{1}{\pm\sqrt{u^2-1}} \,du &= \pm\operatorname{arcosh} u+C \\
&=\sgn(\sin \theta) \operatorname{arcosh} \left| \sec \theta\right|+C.
\end{align}$$

=== Using complex exponential form ===
Under the substitution $z = e^{i\theta},$

$$\begin{align}
&\theta = -i \ln z,\quad
d\theta = \frac{-i}z dz,\quad
\cos \theta = \frac{z + z^{-1}}2,\quad
\sin \theta = \frac{z - z^{-1}}{2i},\quad \\[5mu]
&\sec \theta = \frac2{z + z^{-1}},\quad
\tan \theta = -i\frac{z - z^{-1}}{z + z^{-1}},\quad \\[5mu]
&\sec \theta + \tan \theta = -i\frac{2i + z - z^{-1}}{z + z^{-1}}
= -i\frac{(z + i)(1 + iz^{-1})}{(z - i)(1 + iz^{-1})}
= -i\frac{z + i}{z - i}
\end{align}$$

So the integral can be solved as:

$$\begin{align}
\int \sec \theta \,d\theta
&= \int \frac2{z + z^{-1}}\, \frac{-i}z dz && z = e^{i\theta} \\[5mu]
&= \int \frac{-2i}{z^2 + 1} dz \\
&= \int \frac{1}{z+i} - \frac{1}{z-i} \,dz && \text{partial fraction decomposition} \\[5mu]
&= \ln(z+i)-\ln(z-i) + C \\[5mu]
&= \ln\frac{z + i}{z - i} + C \\[5mu]
&= \ln\bigl(i(\sec \theta + \tan \theta)\bigr)  + C \\[5mu]
&= \ln(\sec \theta + \tan \theta) + \ln i + C
\end{align}$$

Because the constant of integration can be anything, the additional constant term can be absorbed into it. Finally, if theta is real-valued, we can indicate this with absolute value brackets in order to get the equation into its most familiar form:

$$\int \sec \theta \,d\theta = \ln\left|\tan\theta + \sec\theta\right| + C$$

== Gudermannian and Lambertian ==
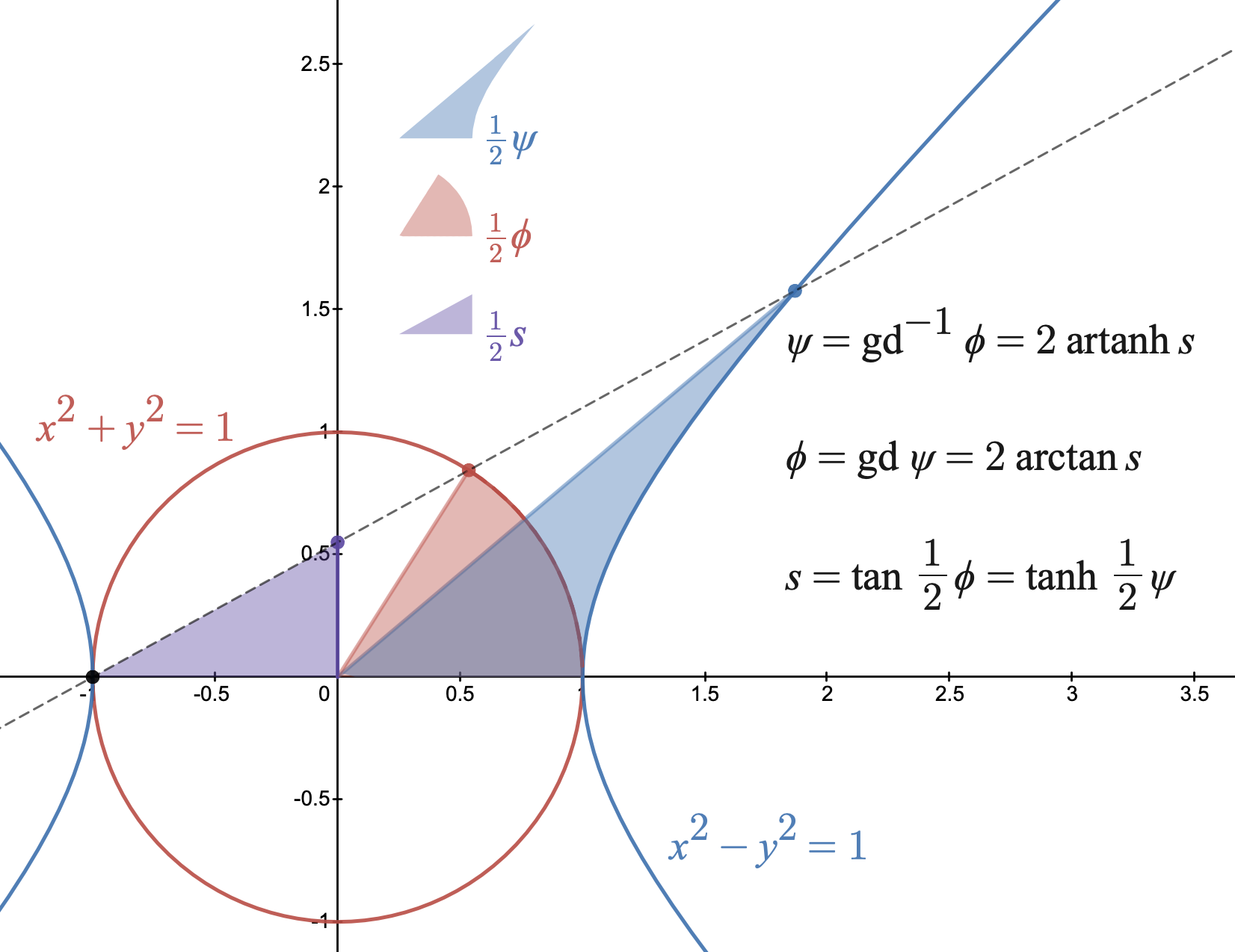
The Gudermannian function relates the area of a circular sector to the area of a hyperbolic sector, via a common stereographic projection. If twice the area of the blue hyperbolic sector is ψ, then twice the area of the red circular sector is ϕ = gd ψ. Twice the area of the purple triangle is the stereographic projection s = tan 1/2ϕ = tanh 1/2ψ. The blue point has coordinates (cosh ψ, sinh ψ). The red point has coordinates (cos ϕ, sin ϕ). The purple point has coordinates (0, s).

The integral of the hyperbolic secant function defines the Gudermannian function:

$$\int_0^\psi \operatorname{sech} u \, du
=\operatorname{gd}\psi.$$

The integral of the secant function defines the Lambertian function, which is the inverse of the Gudermannian function:

$$\int_0^\varphi \sec t \, dt
=\operatorname{lam}\varphi
=\operatorname{gd}^{-1}\varphi.$$

These functions are encountered in the theory of map projections: the Mercator projection of a point on the sphere with longitude λ and latitude ϕ may be written as:

$$(x,y) = \bigl(\lambda,\operatorname{lam}\varphi\bigr).$$

== See also ==
- Integral of secant cubed
