= Tangent half-angle substitution =

Change of variable for integrals involving trigonometric functions

The tangent half-angle substitution is a change of variables used for evaluating integrals, which converts a rational function of trigonometric functions of $x$ into an ordinary rational function of $t$ by setting $t = \tan \tfrac x2$. This is the one-dimensional stereographic projection of the unit circle parametrized by angle measure onto the real line. The general transformation formula is:

$$\int f(\sin x, \cos x)\, dx =\int f{\left(\frac{2t}{1+t^2},\frac{1-t^2}{1+t^2}\right)} \frac{2\,dt}{1+t^2}.$$

The tangent of half an angle is important in spherical trigonometry and was sometimes known in the 17th century as the half tangent or semi-tangent. Leonhard Euler used it to evaluate the integral $\int dx / (a + b\cos x)$ in his 1768 integral calculus textbook, and Adrien-Marie Legendre described the general method in 1817.

The substitution is described in most integral calculus textbooks since the late 19th century, usually without any special name. It is known in Russia as the universal trigonometric substitution, and also known by variant names such as half-tangent substitution or half-angle substitution. It is sometimes misattributed as the Weierstrass substitution. Michael Spivak called it the "world's sneakiest substitution".

== The substitution ==
The tangent half-angle substitution relates an angle to the slope of a line.

Introducing a new variable $t=\tan\tfrac x2,$ sines and cosines can be expressed as rational functions of $t,$ and $dx$ can be expressed as the product of $dt$ and a rational function of $t,$ as follows:
$$\sin x = \frac{2t}{1 + t^2}, \quad \cos x = \frac{1 - t^2}{1 + t^2}, \quad \text{and} \quad dx = \frac{2}{1 + t^2}\,dt.$$

Similar expressions can be written for tan x, cot x, sec x, and csc x.

=== Derivation ===
Using the double-angle formulas $\sin x = 2 \sin \tfrac x2 \cos \tfrac x2$ and $\cos x = \cos^2 \tfrac x2 - \sin^2 \tfrac x2$ and introducing denominators equal to one by the Pythagorean identity $1 = \cos^2 \tfrac x2 + \sin^2 \tfrac x2$ results in

$$\begin{align}
\sin x &= \frac {2\sin \tfrac x2\, \cos \tfrac x2}{\cos^2\tfrac x2 + \sin^2 \tfrac x2} = \frac{2\tan \tfrac x2}{1+\tan^2 \tfrac x2} = \frac{2t}{1 + t^2}, \\[18mu]
\cos x &= \frac {\cos^2 \tfrac x2 - \sin^2 \tfrac x2}{\cos^2 \tfrac x2 + \sin^2 \tfrac x2} = \frac{1-\tan^2 \tfrac x2}{1 + \tan^2 \tfrac x2} = \frac{1 - t^2}{1 + t^2}.\end{align}$$

Finally, since $t = \tan \tfrac x2$, differentiation rules imply

$$dt = \tfrac12\left(1+\tan^2 \tfrac x2\right) dx = \frac{1+t^2}2 \, dx,$$
and thus
$$dx=\frac{2}{1 + t^2} \, dt.$$

== Examples ==
=== Antiderivative of cosecant ===
$$\begin{align}
\int\csc x\,dx&=\int\frac{dx}{\sin x} \\[6pt]
&=\int \left(\frac{1 + t^2}{2t}\right) \left(\frac{2}{1 + t^2}\right)dt  && t = \tan\tfrac x2 \\[6pt]
&=\int\frac{dt}{t} \\[6pt]
&=\ln |t |+ C \\[6pt]
&=\ln \left|\tan\tfrac x2 \right| + C.
\end{align}$$

We can confirm the above result using a standard method of evaluating the cosecant integral by multiplying the numerator and denominator by $\csc x - \cot x$ and performing the substitution $u = \csc x - \cot x,$ $du = \left(-\csc x \cot x + \csc^2 x\right)\,dx$.
$$\begin{align}
\int \csc x \,dx &= \int \frac{\csc x (\csc x - \cot x)}{\csc x - \cot x} \, dx \\[6pt]
&= \int \frac{\left(\csc^2 x - \csc x \cot x\right)\,dx}{\csc x - \cot x} \qquad u = \csc x - \cot x \\[6pt]
&= \int \frac{du}{u} \\[6pt]
&= \ln |u| + C \\[6pt]
&= \ln\left|\csc x - \cot x\right| + C.
\end{align}$$

These two answers are the same because $\csc x - \cot x = \tan \tfrac x2\colon$

$$\begin{align}
\csc x - \cot x
&= \frac{1}{\sin x} - \frac{\cos x}{\sin x} \\[6pt]
&= \frac{1+t^2}{2t} - \frac{1-t^2}{1+t^2}\frac{1+t^2}{2t}  \qquad\qquad t = \tan \tfrac x2 \\[6pt]
&= \frac{2t^2}{2t} = t \\[6pt]
&= \tan \tfrac x2
\end{align}$$

The secant integral may be evaluated in a similar manner.

=== A definite integral ===
We wish to evaluate the integral:

$\int_0^{2\pi} \frac{dx}{2 + \cos x}$

A naïve approach splits the interval and applies the substitution $t = \tan\frac{x}{2}$. However, this substitution has a singularity at $x = \pi$, which corresponds to a vertical asymptote. Therefore, the integral must be split at that point and handled carefully:

$$\begin{align} \int_0^{2\pi} \frac{dx}{2 + \cos x} &= \int_0^\pi \frac{dx}{2 + \cos x} + \int_\pi^{2\pi} \frac{dx}{2 + \cos x} \\[6pt] &= \int_0^\infty \frac{2\,dt}{3 + t^2} + \int_{-\infty}^0 \frac{2\,dt}{3 + t^2} \qquad \text{where } t = \tan\frac{x}{2} \\[6pt] &= \int_{-\infty}^\infty \frac{2\,dt}{3 + t^2} \\[6pt] &= \frac{2}{\sqrt{3}} \int_{-\infty}^\infty \frac{du}{1 + u^2} \qquad \text{where } t = u\sqrt{3} \\[6pt] &= \frac{2\pi}{\sqrt{3}}. \end{align}$$

Note: The substitution $t = \tan\frac{x}{2}$ maps $x \in (0, \pi)$ to $t \in (0, \infty)$ and $x \in (\pi, 2\pi)$ to $t \in (-\infty, 0)$. The point $x = \pi$ corresponds to a vertical asymptote in $t$, so the integral is evaluated as a limit around this point.

Alternatively, we can compute the indefinite integral first:

$\frac{2}{\sqrt{3}} \int_{-\infty}^\infty \frac{du}{1 + u^2}$

this integral evaluates to arctan(u) after solving for u by using u=tan(z) as a substitution then solving for t gives us

$\int \frac{dx}{2 + \cos x} = \frac{2}{\sqrt{3}} \arctan\left( \frac{\tan\frac{x}{2}}{\sqrt{3}} \right) + C$

Using symmetry:

$$\begin{align} \int_0^{2\pi} \frac{dx}{2 + \cos x} &= 2 \int_0^\pi \frac{dx}{2 + \cos x} \\[6pt] &= 2 \lim_{b \to \pi^-} \left[ \frac{2}{\sqrt{3}} \arctan\left( \frac{\tan\frac{x}{2}}{\sqrt{3}} \right) \right]_0^b \\[6pt] &= \frac{4}{\sqrt{3}} \left( \frac{\pi}{2} - 0 \right) = \frac{2\pi}{\sqrt{3}}. \end{align}$$
Thus, the value of the definite integral is:

$\int_0^{2\pi} \frac{dx}{2 + \cos x} = \frac{2\pi}{\sqrt{3}}$

=== Third example: both sine and cosine ===
$$\begin{align} \int \frac{dx}{a\cos x + b\sin x +c} &= \int \frac{2\,dt}{a(1-t^2) + 2bt + c(t^2+1)} \\[6pt]
&= \int \frac{2\,dt}{(c-a)t^2 +2bt+a+c} \\[6pt]
&= \frac{2}{\sqrt{c^2-(a^2+b^2)}} \arctan \left(\frac{(c-a)\tan\tfrac x2 + b}{\sqrt{c^2-(a^2+b^2)}}\right) + C
\end{align}$$
if $c^2-(a^2+b^2)>0.$

== Geometry ==
The tangent half-angle substitution parametrizes the unit circle centered at (0, 0). Instead of +∞ and −∞, we have only one ∞, at both ends of the real line. That is often appropriate when dealing with rational functions and with trigonometric functions. (This is the one-point compactification of the line.)

As x varies, the point (cos x, sin x) winds repeatedly around the unit circle centered at (0, 0). The point

$$\left(\frac{1-t^2}{1+t^2}, \frac{2t}{1+t^2}\right)$$

goes only once around the circle as t goes from −∞ to +∞, and never reaches the point (−1, 0), which is approached as a limit as t approaches ±∞. As t goes from −∞ to −1, the point determined by t goes through the part of the circle in the third quadrant, from (−1, 0) to (0, −1). As t goes from −1 to 0, the point follows the part of the circle in the fourth quadrant from (0, −1) to (1, 0). As t goes from 0 to 1, the point follows the part of the circle in the first quadrant from (1, 0) to (0, 1). Finally, as t goes from 1 to +∞, the point follows the part of the circle in the second quadrant from (0, 1) to (−1, 0).

Here is another geometric point of view. Draw the unit circle, and let P be the point (−1, 0). A line through P (except the vertical line) is determined by its slope. Furthermore, each of the lines (except the vertical line) intersects the unit circle in exactly two points, one of which is P. This determines a function from points on the unit circle to slopes. The trigonometric functions determine a function from angles to points on the unit circle, and by combining these two functions we have a function from angles to slopes.

== Hyperbolic functions ==
As with other properties shared between the trigonometric functions and the hyperbolic functions, it is possible to use hyperbolic identities to construct a similar form of the substitution, $t = \tanh \tfrac x2$:

$$\sinh x = \frac{2t}{1 - t^2}, \quad \cosh x = \frac{1 + t^2}{1 - t^2}, \quad \text{and} \quad dx = \frac{2}{1- t^2}\,dt.$$

Similar expressions can be written for tanh x, coth x, sech x, and csch x. Geometrically, this change of variables is a one-dimensional stereographic projection of the hyperbolic line onto the real interval, analogous to the Poincaré disk model of the hyperbolic plane.

== Alternatives ==
There are other approaches to integrating trigonometric functions. For example, it can be helpful to rewrite trigonometric functions in terms of e^{ix} and e^{−ix} using Euler's formula.

== See also ==
- Rational curve
- Stereographic projection
- Tangent half-angle formula
- Trigonometric substitution
- Euler substitution
