= Q-function =

Statistics function

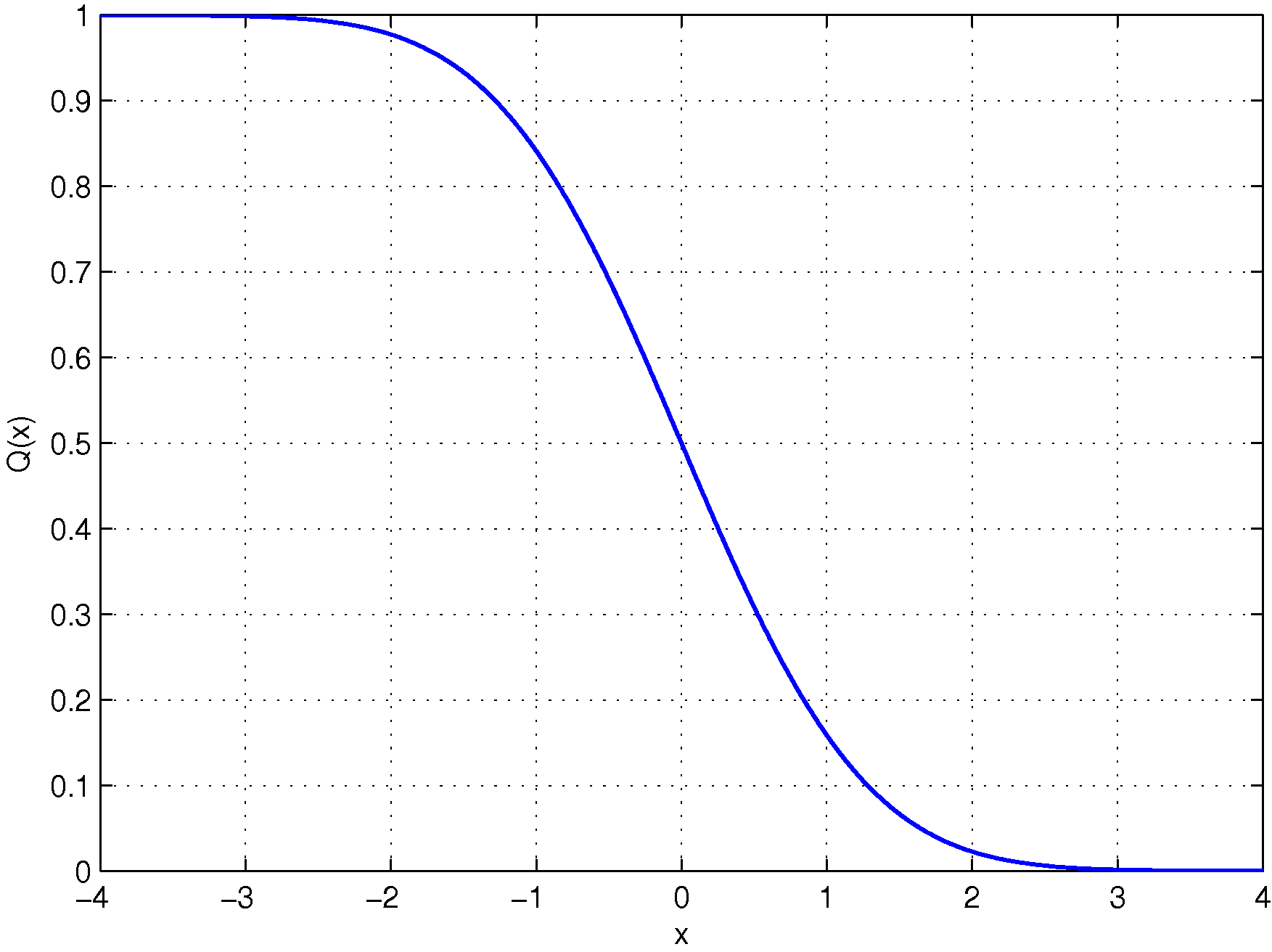
A plot of the Q-function.

In statistics, the Q-function is the tail distribution function of the standard normal distribution. In other words, $Q(x)$ is the probability that a normal (Gaussian) random variable will obtain a value larger than $x$ standard deviations. Equivalently, $Q(x)$ is the probability that a standard normal random variable takes a value larger than $x$.

If $Y$ is a Gaussian random variable with mean $\mu$ and variance $\sigma^2$, then $X = \frac{Y-\mu}{\sigma}$ is standard normal and

$$P(Y > y) = P(X > x) = Q(x)$$

where $x = \frac{y-\mu}{\sigma}$.

Other definitions of the Q-function, all of which are simple transformations of the normal cumulative distribution function, are also used occasionally.

Because of its relation to the cumulative distribution function of the normal distribution, the Q-function can also be expressed in terms of the error function, which is an important function in applied mathematics and physics.

== Definition and basic properties ==
Formally, the Q-function is defined as

$$Q(x) = \frac{1}{\sqrt{2\pi}} \int_x^\infty \exp\left(-\frac{u^2}{2}\right) \, du.$$

Thus,

$$Q(x) = 1 - Q(-x) = 1 - \Phi(x)\,\!,$$

where $\Phi(x)$ is the cumulative distribution function of the standard normal Gaussian distribution.

The Q-function can be expressed in terms of the error function, or the complementary error function, as

$$\begin{align}
Q(x) &=\frac{1}{2}\left( \frac{2}{\sqrt{\pi}} \int_{x/\sqrt{2}}^\infty \exp\left(-t^2\right) \, dt \right)\\
&= \frac{1}{2} - \frac{1}{2} \operatorname{erf} \left( \frac{x}{\sqrt{2}} \right) ~~\text{ -or-}\\
&= \frac{1}{2}\operatorname{erfc} \left(\frac{x}{\sqrt{2}} \right).
\end{align}$$

An alternative form of the Q-function known as Craig's formula, after its discoverer, is expressed as:

$$Q(x) = \frac{1}{\pi} \int_0^{\frac{\pi}{2}} \exp \left( - \frac{x^2}{2 \sin^2 \theta} \right) d\theta.$$

The above proper integral form of Q-function, has been incorrectly credited to Craig. This form of Q-function was implied in earlier works by Wiesten , and explicitly stated by Pawula, Rice and Roberts.

This expression is valid only for positive values of x, but it can be used in conjunction with Q(x) = 1 − Q(−x) to obtain Q(x) for negative values. This form is advantageous in that the range of integration is fixed and finite.

Craig's formula was later extended by Behnad (2020) for the Q-function of the sum of two non-negative variables, as follows:

the Q-function plotted in the complex plane

$Q(x+y) = \frac{1}{\pi} \int_0^{\frac{\pi}{2}} \exp \left( - \frac{x^2}{2 \sin^2 \theta} - \frac{y^2}{2 \cos^2 \theta} \right) d\theta, \quad x,y \geqslant 0 .$

== Bounds and approximations ==
- The Q-function is not an elementary function. However, it can be upper and lower bounded as,

$$\left (\frac{x}{1+x^2} \right ) \phi(x) < Q(x) < \frac{\phi(x)}{x}, \qquad x>0,$$

where $\phi(x)$ is the density function of the standard normal distribution, and the bounds become increasingly tight for large x.

Using the substitution v =u^{2}/2, the upper bound is derived as follows:

$$Q(x) =\int_x^\infty\phi(u)\,du <\int_x^\infty\frac ux\phi(u)\,du =\int_{\frac{x^2}{2}}^\infty\frac{e^{-v}}{x\sqrt{2\pi}}\,dv=-\biggl.\frac{e^{-v}}{x\sqrt{2\pi}}\biggr|_{\frac{x^2}{2}}^\infty=\frac{\phi(x)}{x}.$$

Similarly, using $\phi'(u) = - u \phi(u)$ and the quotient rule,

$$\left(1+\frac1{x^2}\right)Q(x) =\int_x^\infty \left(1+\frac1{x^2}\right)\phi(u)\,du >\int_x^\infty \left(1+\frac1{u^2}\right)\phi(u)\,du =-\biggl.\frac{\phi(u)}u\biggr|_x^\infty
=\frac{\phi(x)}x.$$

Solving for Q(x) provides the lower bound.

The geometric mean of the upper and lower bound gives a suitable approximation for $Q(x)$:

$$Q(x) \approx \frac{\phi(x)}{\sqrt{1 + x^2}}, \qquad x \geq 0.$$

- Tighter bounds and approximations of $Q(x)$ can also be obtained by optimizing the following expression

$$\tilde{Q}(x) = \frac{\phi(x)}{(1-a)x + a\sqrt{x^2 + b}}.$$

For $x \geq 0$, the best upper bound is given by $a = 0.344$ and $b = 5.334$ with maximum absolute relative error of 0.44%. Likewise, the best approximation is given by $a = 0.339$ and $b = 5.510$ with maximum absolute relative error of 0.27%. Finally, the best lower bound is given by $a = 1/\pi$ and $b = 2 \pi$ with maximum absolute relative error of 1.17%.

- The Chernoff bound of the Q-function is

$$Q(x)\leq e^{-\frac{x^2}{2}}, \qquad x>0$$

- Improved exponential bounds and a pure exponential approximation are

$$Q(x)\leq \tfrac{1}{4}e^{-x^2}+\tfrac{1}{4}e^{-\frac{x^2}{2}} \leq \tfrac{1}{2}e^{-\frac{x^2}{2}}, \qquad x>0$$

$$Q(x)\approx \frac{1}{12}e^{-\frac{x^2}{2}}+\frac{1}{4}e^{-\frac{2}{3} x^2}, \qquad x>0$$

- The above were generalized by Tanash & Riihonen (2020), who showed that $Q(x)$ can be accurately approximated or bounded by

$$\tilde{Q}(x) = \sum_{n=1}^N a_n e^{-b_n x^2}.$$

In particular, they presented a systematic methodology to solve the numerical coefficients $\{(a_n,b_n)\}_{n=1}^N$ that yield a minimax approximation or bound: $Q(x) \approx \tilde{Q}(x)$, $Q(x) \leq \tilde{Q}(x)$, or $Q(x) \geq \tilde{Q}(x)$ for $x\geq0$. With the example coefficients tabulated in the paper for $N = 20$, the relative and absolute approximation errors are less than $2.831 \cdot 10^{-6}$ and $1.416 \cdot 10^{-6}$, respectively. The coefficients $\{(a_n,b_n)\}_{n=1}^N$ for many variations of the exponential approximations and bounds up to $N = 25$ have been released to open access as a comprehensive dataset.

- Another approximation of $Q(x)$ for $x \in [0,\infty)$ is given by Karagiannidis & Lioumpas (2007) who showed for the appropriate choice of parameters $\{A, B\}$ that

$$f(x; A, B) = \frac{\left(1 - e^{-Ax}\right)e^{-x^2}}{B\sqrt{\pi} x} \approx \operatorname{erfc} \left(x\right).$$

The absolute error between $f(x; A, B)$ and $\operatorname{erfc}(x)$ over the range $[0, R]$ is minimized by evaluating

$$\{A, B\} = \underset{\{A,B\}}{\arg \min} \frac{1}{R} \int_0^R | f(x; A, B) - \operatorname{erfc}(x) |dx.$$

Using $R = 20$ and numerically integrating, they found the minimum error occurred when $\{A, B\} = \{1.98, 1.135\},$ which gave a good approximation for $\forall x \ge 0.$

Substituting these values and using the relationship between $Q(x)$ and $\operatorname{erfc}(x)$ from above gives

$$Q(x)\approx\frac{\left(  1-e^{\frac{-1.98x} {\sqrt{2}}}\right)  e^{-\frac{x^{2}}{2}}}{1.135\sqrt{2\pi}x}, x \ge 0.$$

Alternative coefficients are also available for the above 'Karagiannidis–Lioumpas approximation' for tailoring accuracy for a specific application or transforming it into a tight bound.

- A tighter and more tractable approximation of $Q(x)$ for positive arguments $x \in [0,\infty)$ is given by López-Benítez & Casadevall (2011) based on a second-order exponential function:

$$Q(x) \approx e^{-ax^2-bx-c}, \qquad x \ge 0.$$

The fitting coefficients $(a,b,c)$ can be optimized over any desired range of arguments in order to minimize the sum of square errors ($a = 0.3842$, $b = 0.7640$, $c = 0.6964$ for $x \in [0,20]$) or minimize the maximum absolute error ($a = 0.4920$, $b = 0.2887$, $c = 1.1893$ for $x \in [0,20]$). This approximation offers some benefits such as a good trade-off between accuracy and analytical tractability (for example, the extension to any arbitrary power of $Q(x)$ is trivial and does not alter the algebraic form of the approximation).

- A pair of tight lower and upper bounds on the Gaussian Q-function for positive arguments $x \in [0, \infty)$ was introduced by Abreu (2012) based on a simple algebraic expression with only two exponential terms:

$$Q(x) \geq \frac{1}{12} e^{-x^2} + \frac{1}{\sqrt{2\pi} (x + 1)} e^{-x^2 / 2}, \qquad x \geq 0,$$

$$Q(x) \leq \frac{1}{50} e^{-x^2} + \frac{1}{2 (x + 1)} e^{-x^2 / 2}, \qquad x \geq 0.$$

These bounds are derived from a unified form $Q_{\mathrm{B}}(x; a, b) = \frac{\exp(-x^2)}{a} + \frac{\exp(-x^2 / 2)}{b (x + 1)}$, where the parameters $a$ and $b$ are chosen to satisfy specific conditions ensuring the lower ($a_{\mathrm{L}} = 12$, $b_{\mathrm{L}} = \sqrt{2\pi}$) and upper ($a_{\mathrm{U}} = 50$, $b_{\mathrm{U}} = 2$) bounding properties. The resulting expressions are notable for their simplicity and tightness, offering a favorable trade-off between accuracy and mathematical tractability. These bounds are particularly useful in theoretical analysis, such as in communication theory over fading channels. Additionally, they can be extended to bound $Q^n(x)$ for positive integers $n$ using the binomial theorem, maintaining their simplicity and effectiveness.

== Inverse Q ==
The inverse Q-function can be related to the inverse error functions:

$$Q^{-1}(y) = \sqrt{2}\ \mathrm{erf}^{-1}(1-2y)  = \sqrt{2}\ \mathrm{erfc}^{-1}(2y)$$

The function $Q^{-1}(y)$ finds application in digital communications. It is usually expressed in dB and generally called Q-factor:

$$\mathrm{Q\text{-}factor} = 20 \log_{10}\!\left(Q^{-1}(y)\right)\!~\mathrm{dB}$$

where y is the bit-error rate (BER) of the digitally modulated signal under analysis. For instance, for quadrature phase-shift keying (QPSK) in additive white Gaussian noise, the Q-factor defined above coincides with the value in dB of the signal to noise ratio that yields a bit error rate equal to y.

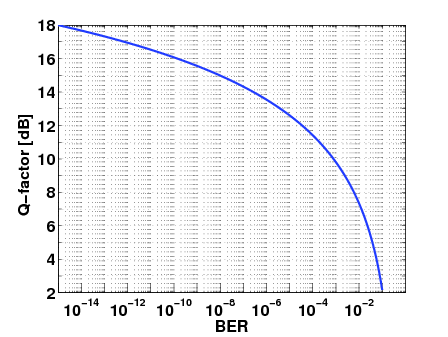
Q-factor vs. bit error rate (BER).

== Values ==
The Q-function is well tabulated and can be computed directly in most of the mathematical software packages such as R and those available in Python, MATLAB and Mathematica. Some values of the Q-function are given below for reference.

Q(0.0)	0.500000000	1/2.0000
Q(0.1)	0.460172163	1/2.1731
Q(0.2)	0.420740291	1/2.3768
Q(0.3)	0.382088578	1/2.6172
Q(0.4)	0.344578258	1/2.9021
Q(0.5)	0.308537539	1/3.2411
Q(0.6)	0.274253118	1/3.6463
Q(0.7)	0.241963652	1/4.1329
Q(0.8)	0.211855399	1/4.7202
Q(0.9)	0.184060125	1/5.4330

Q(1.0)	0.158655254	1/6.3030
Q(1.1)	0.135666061	1/7.3710
Q(1.2)	0.115069670	1/8.6904
Q(1.3)	0.096800485	1/10.3305
Q(1.4)	0.080756659	1/12.3829
Q(1.5)	0.066807201	1/14.9684
Q(1.6)	0.054799292	1/18.2484
Q(1.7)	0.044565463	1/22.4389
Q(1.8)	0.035930319	1/27.8316
Q(1.9)	0.028716560	1/34.8231

Q(2.0)	0.022750132	1/43.9558
Q(2.1)	0.017864421	1/55.9772
Q(2.2)	0.013903448	1/71.9246
Q(2.3)	0.010724110	1/93.2478
Q(2.4)	0.008197536	1/121.9879
Q(2.5)	0.006209665	1/161.0393
Q(2.6)	0.004661188	1/214.5376
Q(2.7)	0.003466974	1/288.4360
Q(2.8)	0.002555130	1/391.3695
Q(2.9)	0.001865813	1/535.9593

Q(3.0)	0.001349898	1/740.7967
Q(3.1)	0.000967603	1/1033.4815
Q(3.2)	0.000687138	1/1455.3119
Q(3.3)	0.000483424	1/2068.5769
Q(3.4)	0.000336929	1/2967.9820
Q(3.5)	0.000232629	1/4298.6887
Q(3.6)	0.000159109	1/6285.0158
Q(3.7)	0.000107800	1/9276.4608
Q(3.8)	0.000072348	1/13822.0738
Q(3.9)	0.000048096	1/20791.6011
Q(4.0)	0.000031671	1/31574.3855

== Generalization to high dimensions ==
The Q-function can be generalized to higher dimensions:

$$Q(\mathbf{x})= \mathbb{P}(\mathbf{X}\geq \mathbf{x}),$$

where $\mathbf{X}\sim \mathcal{N}(\mathbf{0},\, \Sigma)$ follows the multivariate normal distribution with covariance $\Sigma$ and the threshold is of the form $\mathbf{x}=\gamma\Sigma\mathbf{l}^*$ for some positive vector $\mathbf{l}^*>\mathbf{0}$ and positive constant $\gamma>0$. As in the one dimensional case, there is no simple analytical formula for the Q-function. Nevertheless, the Q-function can be approximated arbitrarily well as $\gamma$ becomes larger and larger.
