= TXS 0035+227 =

Radio galaxy in the constellation Andromeda

TXS 0035+277
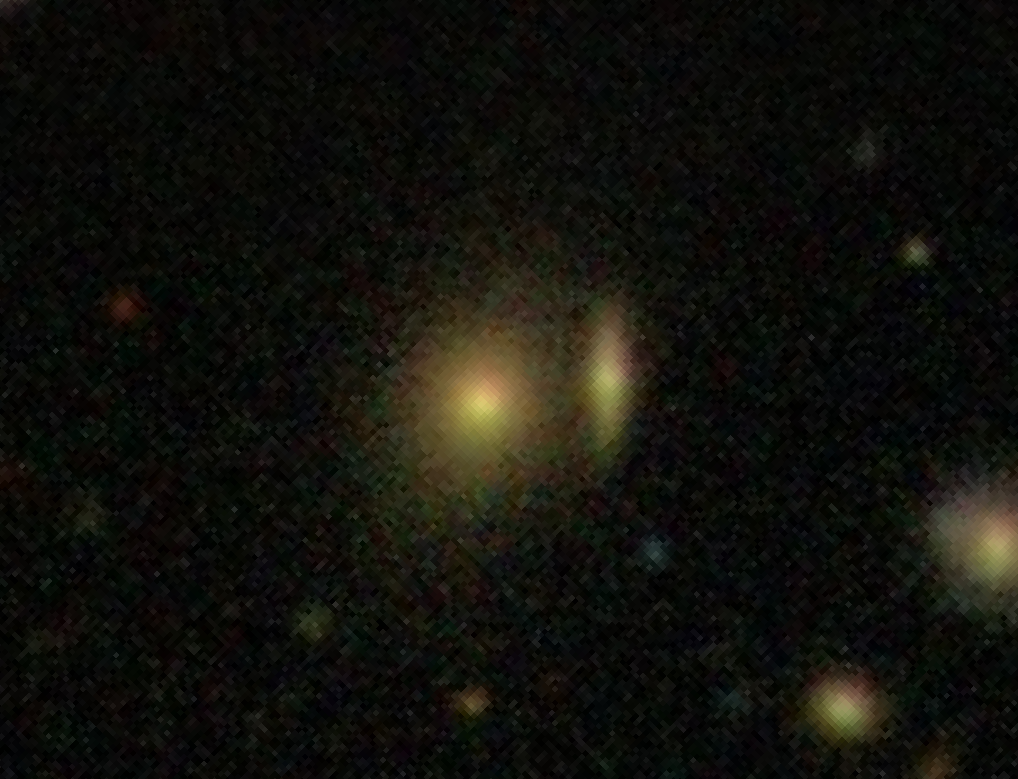
- SDSS image of TXS 0035+227

Observation data (J2000.0 epoch)
- Constellation: Andromeda
- Right ascension: 00^{h} 38^{m} 08.09^{s}
- Declination: +23° 03′ 28.55″
- Redshift: 0.096000
- Heliocentric radial velocity: 28,780 ± 600 km/s
- Distance: 1,391.6 ± 105.6 Mly (426.67 ± 32.38 Mpc)
- Magnitude (J): 13.91

Characteristics
- Type: WLRG Sy2
- Size: ~390,600 ly (119.77 kpc) (estimated)

Other designations
- NVSS J003808+230327, 2MASX J00380809+2303286, B20035+22, IVS B0035+227, LEDA 1680673

TXS 0035+227 is a low-excitation radio galaxy located in the constellation of Andromeda. The redshift of the object is (z) 0.096 and it was first discovered as a flat spectrum radio source in July 1996 and thus identified with a galaxy counterpart, with a total optical polarization of 84%.

== Description ==
TXS 0035+227 is classified as a weak emission-line radio galaxy with weak emission lines in its optical spectrum. It is also categorized as a compact symmetrical object (CSO) with a linear size that is estimated to be 21.8 parsecs and a kinematic age of 567 years. The source is described as point-like on kiloparsec scales, with a central component based on radio imaging made with the Very Long Baseline Array (VLBA). The radio jet size is estimated to be only 0.015 kiloparsecs in length. The radio luminosity at 5 GHz is found to be 24.72 W Hz^{−1}.

The supermassive black hole in the center of TXS 0035+227 is estimated to be 8.4 M_{☉} with the total bolometric disk luminosity of 5.98 × 10^{44} erg s^{−1}. A luminosity spectral density at 1.4 GHz frequencies has been calculated to be 12.89 × 10^{24} W Hz^{−1}. The radio core flux density is 18 mJy and has a monochromatic luminosity of 1.6E+40 erg s^{−1}. The radio spectra index appears to be steep between the frequencies of 8 and 43 GHz, with the galaxy's nuclear region described to be of a type 2 Seyfert galaxy based on a line profile fitting analysis. The lines show a full width at half maximum (FWHM) of 1,078 kilometers per seconds.
