= Christian Kramp =

French mathematician

- Born: 8 July 1760; Strasbourg, Kingdom of France
- Died: 13 May 1826 (aged 65); Strasbourg, Kingdom of France
- Occupation: Mathematician
- Known for: Factorials; Kramp function

Christian Kramp (8 July 1760 – 13 May 1826) was a French mathematician, who worked primarily with factorials.

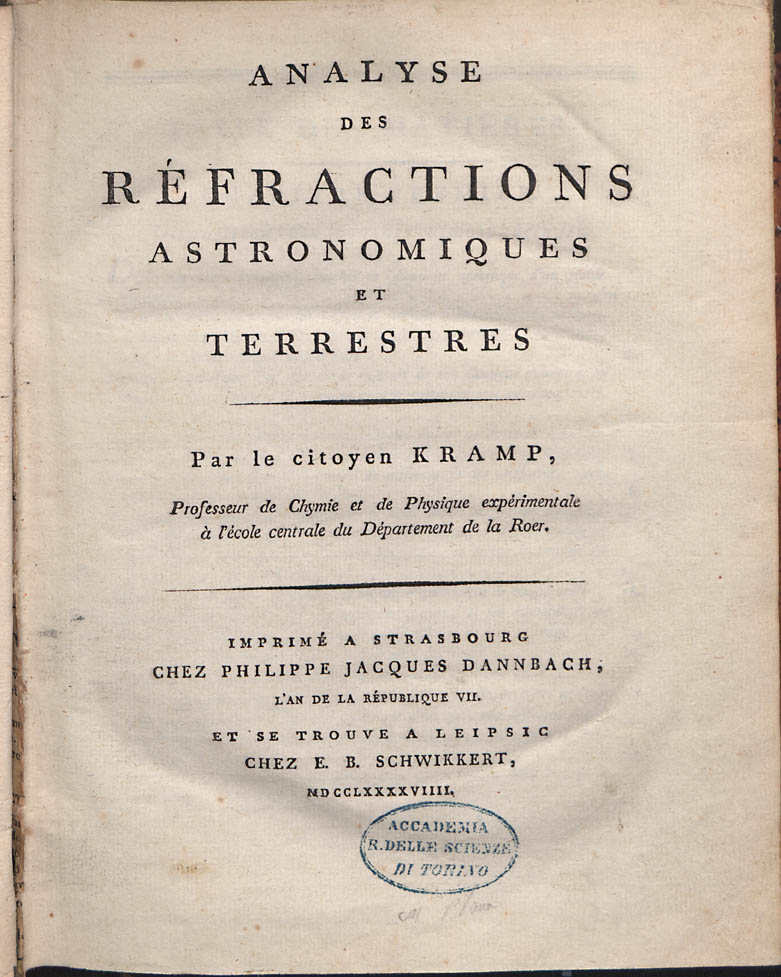
Analyse des réfractions astronomiques et terrestres, 1799

Christian Kramp's father was his teacher at grammar school in Strasbourg. Kramp studied medicine and graduated; however, his interests certainly ranged outside medicine, for in addition to a number of medical publications he published a work on crystallography in 1793. In 1795, France annexed the Rhineland area in which Kramp was carrying out his work and after this he became a teacher at Cologne (this city was French from 1794 to 1815), teaching mathematics, chemistry, and physics. Kramp could read and write in German and French.

Kramp was appointed professor of mathematics at Strasbourg, the town of his birth, in 1809. He was elected to the geometry section of the French Academy of Sciences in 1817. As Bessel, Legendre and Gauss did, Kramp worked on the generalised factorial function which applied to non-integers. His work on factorials is independent of that of James Stirling and Vandermonde. He was the first to use the notation n! in Elements d'arithmétique universelle, 1808. In fact, the more general concept of factorial was found at the same time by Arbogast.

I use the very simple notation n! to designate the product of numbers decreasing from n to unity, i.e. n(n − 1)(n − 2) ... 3 . 2 . 1. The constant use in combinatorial analysis, in most of my proofs, that I make of this idea, has made this notation necessary. [...] I have given it the name 'faculty'. Arbogast has substituted the name 'factorial' which is clearer and more French. In adopting his idea I congratulate myself on paying homage to the memory of my friend.

— Christian Kramp, preface to Elements d'arithmétique universelle, pp. V-VI and XI-XII, 1808

Kramp's function, a scaled complex error function, is today better known as the Faddeeva function.

== Works ==
- Analyse des réfractions astronomiques et terrestres (in French). Strasbourg: Philipp Jakob Dannbach. 1799. Bibcode:1799adra.book.....K.
