= QSO B0153+744 =

Quasar in the constellation Cassiopeia

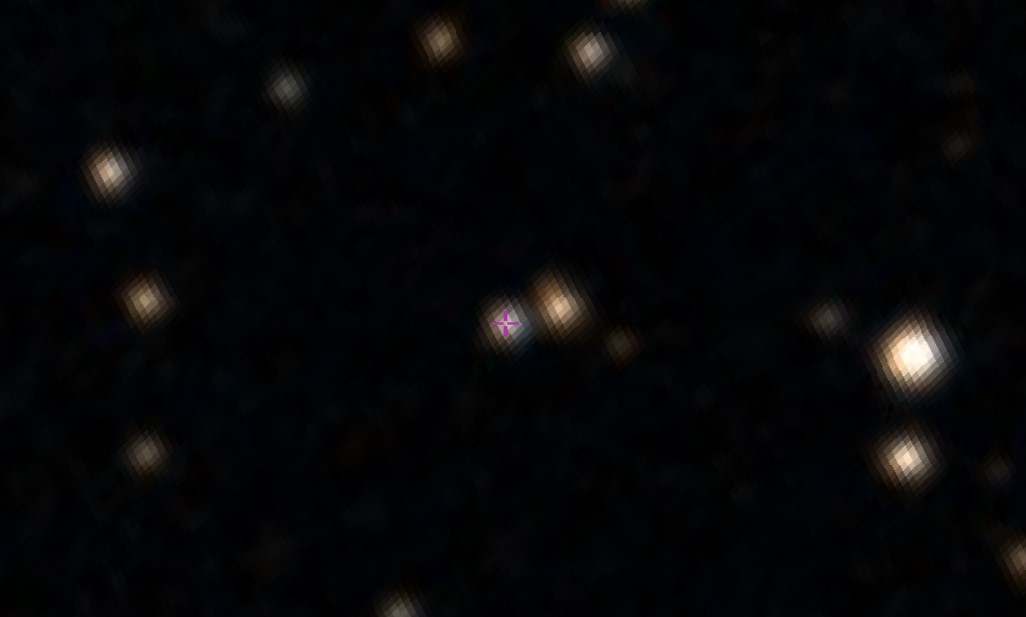
- The quasar QSO B0153+744.

Observation data (J2000.0 epoch)
- Constellation: Cassiopeia
- Right ascension: 01^{h} 57^{m} 34.964^{s}
- Declination: +74° 42′ 43.230″
- Redshift: 2.338000
- Heliocentric radial velocity: 700,915 km/s
- Distance: 10.512 Gly
- Apparent magnitude (V): 16.0
- Apparent magnitude (B): 16.0

Characteristics
- Type: LPQ, RLQ

Other designations
- S5 0153+74, NVSS J015735+744241, QSO J0157+1442, RORF 0153+744, 1RXS J015735.2+744246, [HB89] 0153+744

QSO B0153+744 is a quasar located in the constellation of Cassiopeia. It has a redshift of (z) 2.338 and has an optical brightness of m_{R} = 17.5 magnitude. It was first discovered as an astronomical radio source in 1988. The radio spectrum of the source appears as flat when seen at centimeter wavelengths but optically thin at millimeter wavelengths. This object is also classified as radio-loud and exhibits low polarization, making it a low polarized quasar (LPQ).

== Description ==
The radio source of QSO B0153+744 is found to be both one-sided and complex. However, when shown at both frequencies, it is revealed as double source that is embedded inside a halo. In its radio structure, the 15.4 GHz emission is found to be dominated by two main components with a separation gap of 10 milliarcseconds. These two main components are classified as the northern component and southern component respectively. The northern component contains an inverted spectrum whereas the southern component has a steep spectra.

In 1997, these two components of QSO B0153+744 were studied further. This in turn, were confirmed as a jet-core component and a bright secondary component. The former shows core-jet structure made up of four distinctive components, when resolved at 1.3 centimeter (cm) wavelengths whereas the latter is stationary and exhibits a complicated structure. Further evidence shows the spectral index of the bright component's emission is near to one of the steep-spectrum jet components at ranges between 6 cm and 3.6 cm.

A strong one-sided jet is present in QSO B0153+744 with its projected direction changing by an 180° angle. There are three other sub-components present (the jet's innermost regions). The two sub-components are shown trailing the jet's direction with a switch of 65° ± 3° at distance r = (0.65 ± 0.05) mas to 88° ± 8° at distance r = (1.35 ± 0.05) mas, while the third sub-component is trailing the jet's outermost regions. Based on the jet's speed and its change of direction, this indicates the radio source of QSO B0153+744 is relatively young.
