= Henry Gordon Dawson =

Irish mathematician

Henry Gordon Dawson (2 August 1862 in Omagh, County Tyrone – 22 February 1918 in Hastings, East Sussex) was an Irish mathematician. The Dawson function is named after him.

== Education and career ==
Dawson was educated at Trinity College Dublin (BA 1882, 1st Senior Moderator and Gold Medallist) and at Christ's College, Cambridge (BA as 19th wrangler 1886, MA 1890). In 1897 he created the function that has since been named after him. His career included stints as Mathematical Lecturer at Cambridge (at least 1888–94) and at Firth College, Sheffield (1901–10). He was a member of the Royal Irish Academy.
