= Dawson function =

Mathematical function

Plot of the Dawson integral function F(z) in the complex plane from -2-2i to 2+2i with colors created with Mathematica 13.1 function ComplexPlot3D

In mathematics, the Dawson function or Dawson integral (named after H. G. Dawson) is the one-sided Fourier–Laplace sine transform of the Gaussian function.

== Definition ==
The Dawson function, $F(x) = D_+(x),$ around the origin

The Dawson function, $D_-(x),$ around the origin

The Dawson function is defined as either:
$$D_+(x) = e^{-x^2} \int_0^x e^{t^2}\,dt,$$
also denoted as $F(x)$ or $D(x),$ or alternatively
$$D_-(x) = e^{x^2} \int_0^x e^{-t^2}\,dt.\!$$

The Dawson function is the one-sided Fourier–Laplace sine transform of the Gaussian function,
$$D_+(x) = \frac12 \int_0^\infty e^{-t^2/4}\,\sin(xt)\,dt.$$

It is closely related to the error function erf, as

$$D_+(x) = {\sqrt{\pi} \over 2} e^{-x^2} \operatorname{erfi} (x) = - {i \sqrt{\pi} \over 2 }e^{-x^2} \operatorname{erf} (ix)$$

where erfi is the imaginary error function, erfi(x) = −i erf(ix).
Similarly,
$$D_-(x) = \frac{\sqrt{\pi}}{2} e^{x^2} \operatorname{erf}(x)$$
in terms of the real error function, erf.

In terms of either erfi or the Faddeeva function $w(z),$ the Dawson function can be extended to the entire complex plane:
$$F(z) = {\sqrt{\pi} \over 2} e^{-z^2} \operatorname{erfi} (z) = \frac{i\sqrt{\pi}}{2} \left[ e^{-z^2} - w(z) \right],$$
which simplifies to
$$D_+(x) = F(x) = \frac{\sqrt{\pi}}{2} \operatorname{Im}[w(x)]$$
$$D_-(x) = i F(-ix) = -\frac{\sqrt{\pi}}{2} \left[ e^{x^2} - w(-ix) \right]$$
for real $x.$

For $|x|$ near zero, F(x) ≈ x. For $|x|$ large, F(x) ≈ 1/(2x). More specifically, near the origin it has the series expansion
$$F(x) = \sum_{k=0}^\infty \frac{(-1)^k \, 2^k}{(2k+1)!!} \, x^{2k+1}
= x - \frac{2}{3} x^3 + \frac{4}{15} x^5 - \cdots,$$
while for large $x$ it has the asymptotic expansion
$$F(x) = \frac{1}{2 x} + \frac{1}{4 x^3} + \frac{3}{8 x^5} + \cdots.$$

More precisely
$$\left|F(x) - \sum_{k=0}^{N} \frac{(2k-1)!!}{2^{k+1} x^{2k+1}}\right| \leq \frac{C_N}{x^{2N+3}}.$$
where $n!!$ is the double factorial.

$F(x)$ satisfies the differential equation
$$\frac{dF}{dx} + 2xF = 1\,\!$$
with the initial condition $F(0) = 0.$ Consequently, it has extrema for
$$F(x) = \frac{1}{2 x},$$
resulting in x = ±0.92413887... (OEIS: A133841), F(x) = ±0.54104422... (OEIS: A133842).

Inflection points follow for
$$F(x) = \frac{x}{2 x^2 - 1},$$
resulting in x = ±1.50197526... (OEIS: A133843), F(x) = ±0.42768661... (OEIS: A245262). (Apart from the trivial inflection point at $x = 0,$ $F(x) = 0.$)

== Relation to Hilbert transform of Gaussian ==
The Hilbert transform of the Gaussian is defined as
$$H(y) = \pi^{-1} \operatorname{P.V.} \int_{-\infty}^\infty \frac{e^{-x^2}}{y-x} \, dx$$

P.V. denotes the Cauchy principal value, and we restrict ourselves to real $y.$ $H(y)$ can be related to the Dawson function as follows. Inside a principal value integral, we can treat $1/u$ as a generalized function or distribution, and use the Fourier representation
$${1 \over u} = \int_0^\infty dk \, \sin ku = \int_0^\infty dk \, \operatorname{Im} e^{iku}.$$

With $1/u = 1/(y-x),$ we use the exponential representation of $\sin(ku)$ and complete the square with respect to $x$ to find
$$\pi H(y) = \operatorname{Im} \int_0^\infty dk \,\exp[-k^2/4+iky] \int_{-\infty}^\infty dx \, \exp[-(x+ik/2)^2].$$

We can shift the integral over $x$ to the real axis, and it gives $\pi^{1/2}.$ Thus
$$\pi^{1/2} H(y) = \operatorname{Im} \int_0^\infty dk \, \exp[-k^2/4+iky].$$

We complete the square with respect to $k$ and obtain
$$\pi^{1/2}H(y) = e^{-y^2} \operatorname{Im} \int_0^\infty dk \, \exp[-(k/2-iy)^2].$$

We change variables to $u = ik/2+y:$
$$\pi^{1/2}H(y) = -2e^{-y^2} \operatorname{Im} i \int_y^{i\infty+y} du\ e^{u^2}.$$

The integral can be performed as a contour integral around a rectangle in the complex plane. Taking the imaginary part of the result gives
$$H(y) = 2\pi^{-1/2} F(y)$$
where $F(y)$ is the Dawson function as defined above.

The Hilbert transform of $x^{2n}e^{-x^2}$ is also related to the Dawson function. We see this with the technique of differentiating inside the integral sign. Let
$$H_n = \pi^{-1} \operatorname{P.V.} \int_{-\infty}^\infty \frac{x^{2n}e^{-x^2}}{y-x} \, dx.$$

Introduce
$$H_a = \pi^{-1} \operatorname{P.V.} \int_{-\infty}^\infty {e^{-ax^2} \over y-x} \, dx.$$

The $n$th derivative is
$${\partial^nH_a \over \partial a^n} = (-1)^n\pi^{-1} \operatorname{P.V.} \int_{-\infty}^\infty \frac{x^{2n}e^{-ax^2}}{y-x} \, dx.$$

We thus find
$$\left . H_n = (-1)^n \frac{\partial^nH_a}{\partial a^n} \right|_{a=1}.$$

The derivatives are performed first, then the result evaluated at $a = 1.$ A change of variable also gives $H_a = 2\pi^{-1/2}F(y\sqrt a).$ Since $F'(y) = 1-2yF(y),$ we can write $H_n = P_1(y)+P_2(y)F(y)$ where $P_1$ and $P_2$ are polynomials. For example, $H_1 = -\pi^{-1/2}y + 2\pi^{-1/2}y^2F(y).$ Alternatively, $H_n$ can be calculated using the recurrence relation (for $n \geq 0$)
$$H_{n+1}(y) = y^2 H_n(y) - \frac{(2n-1)!!}{\sqrt{\pi} 2^n} y.$$

== See also ==
- List of mathematical functions
