= George Karagiannidis =

Greek electrical and computer engineer

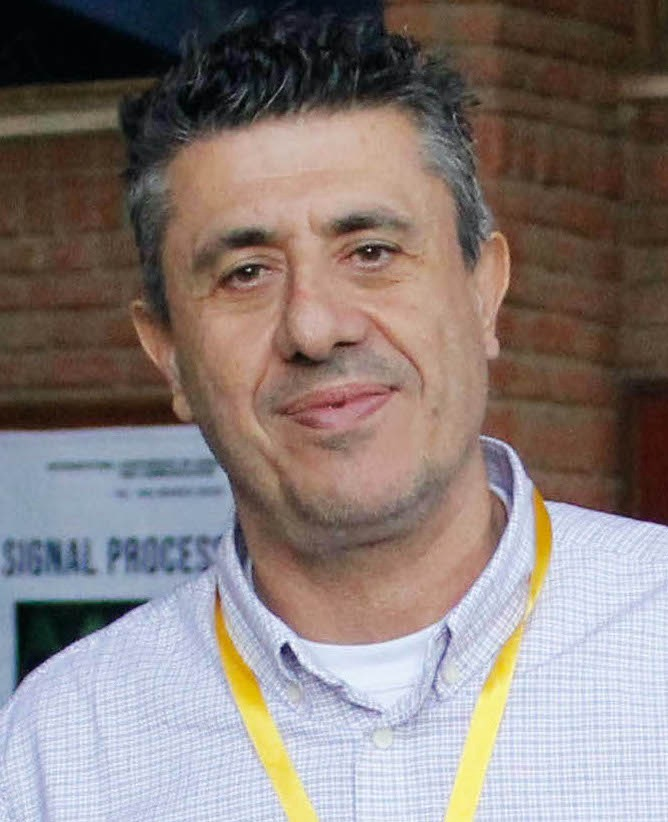
- Born: Pythagoreio, Samos Island, Greece

Academic background
- Education: University of Patras

Academic work
- Institutions: Professor at Aristotle University of Thessaloniki, Visitor Professor at Friedrich-Alexander-Universität
- Website: geokarag.webpages.auth.gr

George Karagiannidis is a professor of electrical and computer engineering at the Department of Electrical and Computer Engineering of Aristotle University of Thessaloniki and a director of the Digital Telecommunications Systems and Networks Laboratory. He was named Fellow of the Institute of Electrical and Electronics Engineers (IEEE) in 2014 "for contributions to the performance analysis of wireless communication systems".

== Early life and education ==
He was born in Pythagoreio (Pithagorion), Samos Island, Greece, in 1963. Between 1990 and 1997 he worked as a freelance engineer on electromechanical projects. He received the 5-year University Diploma in electrical and computer engineering from the University of Patras in 1987, and his PhD from the same institution, also in electrical and computer engineering.

== Career ==
From 2000/2001 to 2004, he was a researcher, later senior researcher, at the Institute for Space Applications and Remote Sensing (now the Institute for Astronomy, Astrophysics, Space Applications and Remote Sensing, IAASARS) of the National Observatory of Athens, Greece, working in the field of satellite communications.

In June 2004, Karagiannidis joined the faculty of Aristotle University of Thessaloniki, and since that time has been a Professor in the Department of Electrical and Computer Engineering and director of the Digital Telecommunications Systems and Networks Laboratory. He is also an Honorary Professor at Southwest Jiaotong University in Chengdu, China. From 2023 to 2025, he was a visiting professor at Friedrich-Alexander-Universität Erlangen-Nürnberg in Germany.

In 2004, Karagiannidis founded the Wireless Communications & Information Processing (WCIP) Group (also referred to as the Wireless Communications Systems Group, WCSG), part of the Electrical and Computer Engineering Department of Aristotle University of Thessaloniki. The group conducts fundamental and applied research in telecommunications systems and signal processing, both independently and through more than 30 international collaborations. Its research areas include RF and optical wireless communications (communications theory, wireless power transfer, machine learning, security, and caching), machine learning for communications, signal processing, and communications security.

From September 2018 to June 2022, he served as Associate Editor-in-Chief of the IEEE Open Journal of the Communications Society. He has also served on the Steering Committee of IEEE Transactions on Cognitive Communications and Networking.

Since January 2025, he has been Editor-in-Chief of IEEE Transactions on Communications, a monthly peer-reviewed journal published by the IEEE Communications Society.

== Awards ==
Karagiannidis has received several prestigious awards, including the 2018 IEEE ComSoc Signal Processing and Communications Electronics (SPCE) Technical Recognition Award, the 2021 IEEE ComSoc Radio Communications Committee (RCC) Technical Recognition Award, and the 2022 Humboldt Research Award from the Alexander von Humboldt Foundation in Germany.

He has been recognized by Clarivate Analytics (formerly Thomson Reuters) as a Web of Science Highly Cited Researcher every year from 2015 onward, a streak that reached ten consecutive years, 2015–2024.

== Authorship ==
Karagiannidis is also an author of fiction. His first novel, an historical novel in Greek titled Η καρδιά μου το όπλο σου ("My Heart, Your Gun"), was published by Armos Editions and released in bookstores on 6 June 2022, with a launch event held on 20 June 2022 at the Byzantine Museum of Thessaloniki. The book, described by the author as primarily a love story set against a historical backdrop, follows characters, including a German Wehrmacht soldier, Alfred Eichwald, as a central figure, through the interwar period, the rise of Nazism in Weimar Germany, and the Italian occupation of the Dodecanese islands during the Second World War. It was his first literary work, following an academic and scientific career, and he presented the book in several Greek cities, including on Samos and in Pythagoreio, his birthplace.

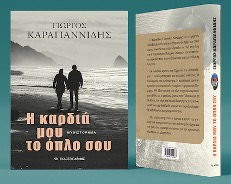
An historical novel in Greek language with the title “My heart your gun”

== Books and textbooks ==
In addition to his 2022 historical novel, Karagiannidis has authored and co-authored technical books:

- He is the author of a Greek-language textbook titled Τηλεπικοινωνιακά Συστήματα ("Telecommunications Systems").
- He is co-author of Advanced Optical Wireless Communications Systems, published by Cambridge University Press in 2012.
- He has also co-authored multiple book chapters in edited technical volumes.
