= Ars Magna (Cardano book) =

1545 text on mathematics by Gerolamo Cardano

Artis Magnae, Sive de Regulis Algebraicis, Liber unus
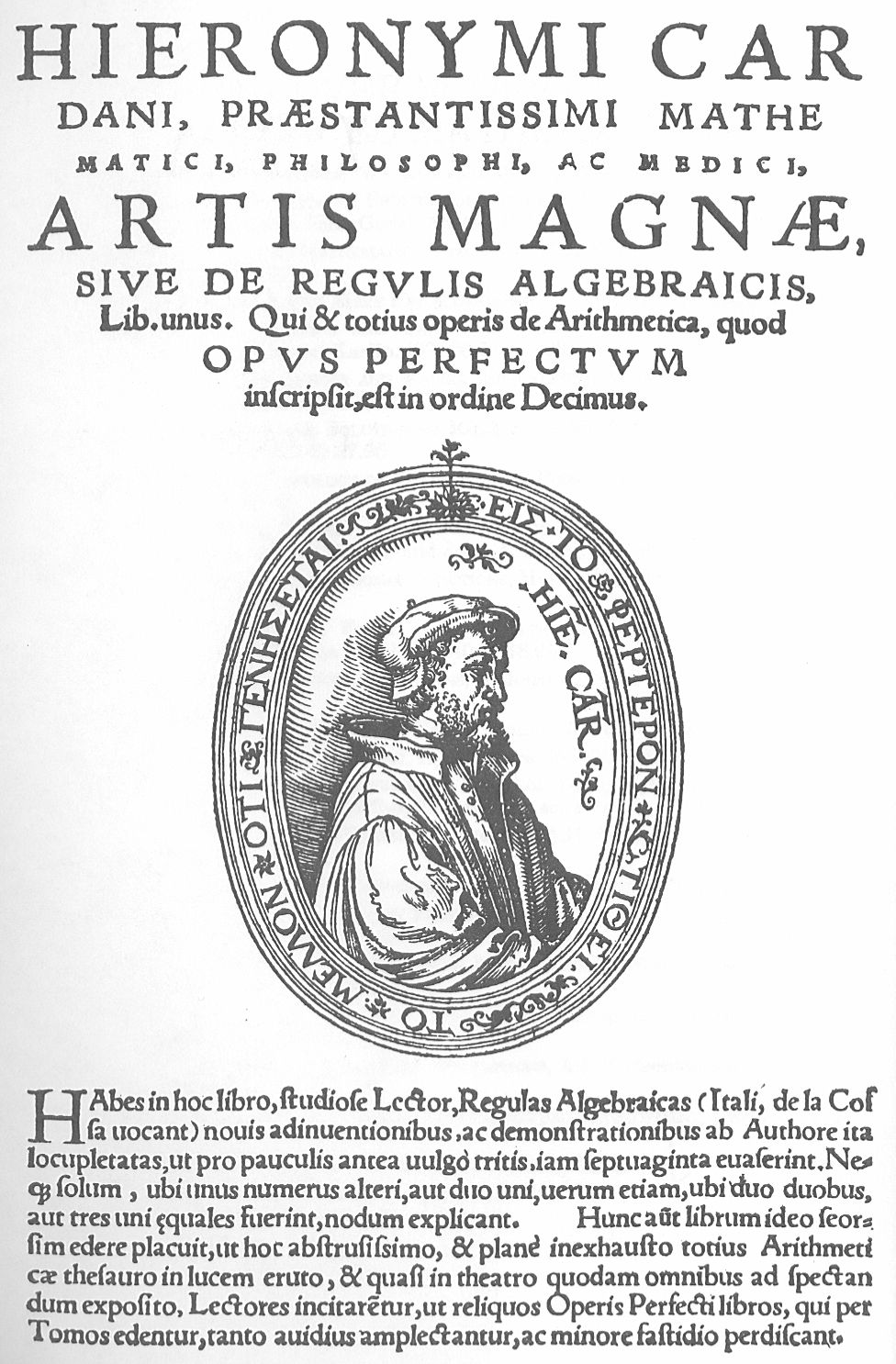
- The title page of the Ars Magna
- Author: Girolamo Cardano
- Language: Latin
- Subject: Mathematics
- Publication date: 1545

The Ars Magna (The Great Art, 1545) is an important Latin-language book on algebra written by Gerolamo Cardano. It was first published in 1545 under the title Artis Magnae, Sive de Regulis Algebraicis, Lib. unus (The Great Art, or The Rules of Algebra, Book one). There was a second edition in Cardano's lifetime, published in 1570. It is considered one of the three greatest scientific treatises of the early Renaissance, together with Copernicus' De revolutionibus orbium coelestium and Vesalius' De humani corporis fabrica. The first editions of these three books were published within a two-year span (1543–1545).

== History ==
In 1535, Niccolò Fontana Tartaglia became famous for having solved cubics of the form x^{3} + ax = b (with a,b > 0). However, he chose to keep his method secret. In 1539, Cardano, then a lecturer in mathematics at the Piatti Foundation in Milan, published his first mathematical book, Pratica Arithmeticæ et mensurandi singularis (The Practice of Arithmetic and Simple Mensuration). That same year, he asked Tartaglia to explain to him his method for solving cubic equations. After some reluctance, Tartaglia did so, but he asked Cardano not to share the information until he published it. Cardano submerged himself in mathematics during the next several years working on how to extend Tartaglia's formula to other types of cubics. Furthermore, his student Lodovico Ferrari found a way of solving quartic equations, but Ferrari's method depended upon Tartaglia's, since it involved the use of an auxiliary cubic equation. Then Cardano became aware of the fact that Scipione del Ferro had discovered Tartaglia's formula before Tartaglia himself, a discovery that prompted him to publish these results.

== Contents ==
The book, which is divided into forty chapters, contains the first published algebraic solution to cubic and quartic equations. Cardano acknowledges that Tartaglia gave him the formula for solving a type of cubic equations and that the same formula had been discovered by Scipione del Ferro. He also acknowledges that it was Ferrari who found a way of solving quartic equations.

Since at the time negative numbers were not generally acknowledged, knowing how to solve cubics of the form x^{3} + ax = b did not mean knowing how to solve cubics of the form x^{3} = ax + b (with a,b > 0), for instance. Besides, Cardano also explains how to reduce equations of the form x^{3} + ax^{2} + bx + c = 0 to cubic equations without a quadratic term, but, again, he has to consider several cases. In all, Cardano was driven to the study of thirteen different types of cubic equations (chapters XI–XXIII).

In Ars Magna the concept of multiple root appears for the first time (chapter I). The first example that Cardano provides of a polynomial equation with multiple roots is x^{3} = 12x + 16, of which −2 is a double root.

Ars Magna also contains the first occurrence of complex numbers (chapter XXXVII). The problem mentioned by Cardano which leads to square roots of negative numbers is: find two numbers whose sum is equal to 10 and whose product is equal to 40. The answer is 5 + √−1̅5̅ and 5 − √−1̅5̅. Cardano called this "sophistic," because he saw no physical meaning to it, but boldly wrote "nevertheless we will operate" and formally calculated that their product does indeed equal 40. Cardano then says that this answer is "as subtle as it is useless".

It is a common misconception that Cardano introduced complex numbers in solving cubic equations. Since (in modern notation) Cardano's formula for a root of the polynomial x^{3} + px + q is

$$\sqrt[3]{-\frac q2+\sqrt{\frac{q^2}{4}+\frac{p^3}{27}}}+\sqrt[3]{-\frac q2-\sqrt{\frac{q^2}{4}+\frac{p^3}{27}}},$$

square roots of negative numbers appear naturally in this context. However, q^{2}/4 + p^{3}/27 never happens to be negative in the specific cases in which Cardano applies the formula.

== Bibliography ==
- Calinger, Ronald (1999), A contextual history of Mathematics, Prentice-Hall, ISBN 0-02-318285-7
- Cardano, Gerolamo (1993) [1545], Ars magna or The Rules of Algebra, Dover, ISBN 0-486-67811-3
- Gindikin, Simon (1988), Tales of physicists and mathematicians, Birkhäuser, ISBN 3-7643-3317-0
