= Bombelli =

Bombelli is an Italian surname. Notable people with the surname include:

- Rafael Bombelli (1526–1572), Italian mathematician
- Sebastiano Bombelli (1635–1719), Italian painter

== See also ==
- Bombelli (crater), a lunar crater
