= Francesco Cigalini =

Italian mathematician and physician

- Born: 1489; Como
- Died: 5 July 1551 (aged 61–62); Como
- Occupation: Medical doctor, astrologer
- Children: Paolo Cigalini

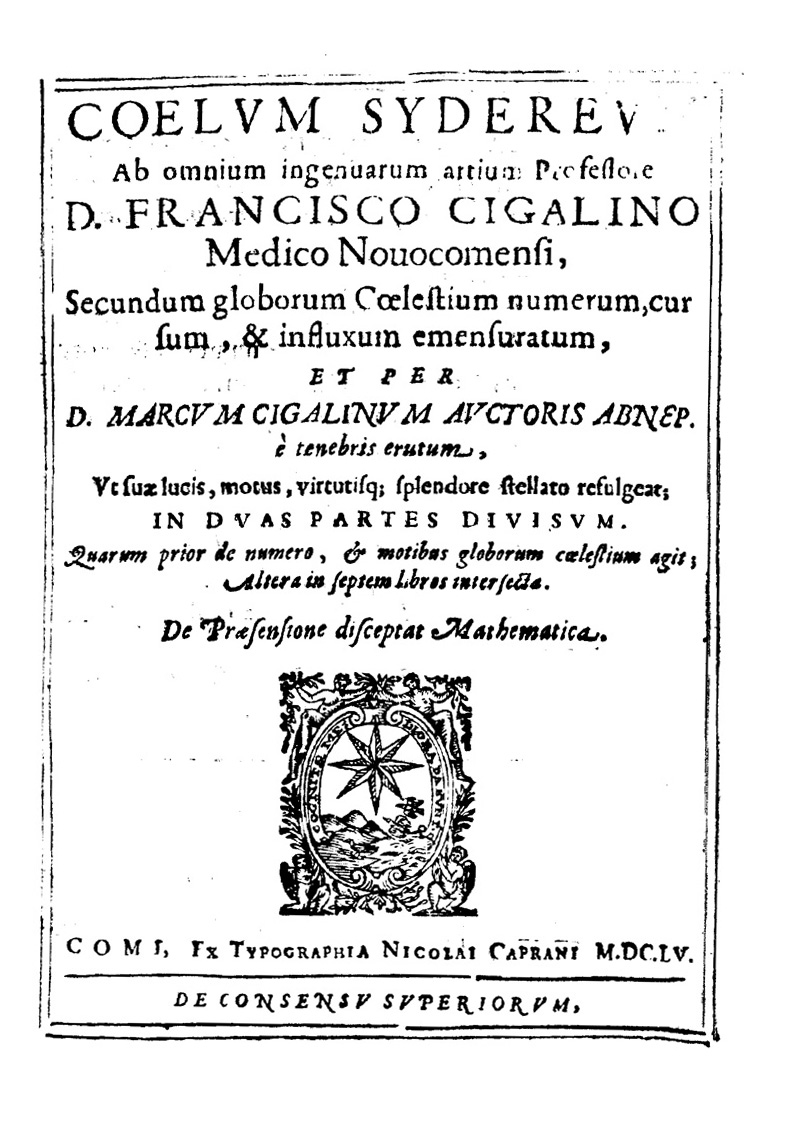
Coelum sydereum, 1655

Francesco Cigalini (1489–1551) was an Italian humanist, physician and astrologer.

== Life ==
Born in Como, son of the physician Paolo Cigalini, Francesco followed the studies of the father, but also was interested in other fields such as history, ancient languages, philosophy, theology, and had a real passion for astrology, becoming a major personality in Como. He was also an excellent connoisseur of Greek and Hebrew. He wrote a number of books, most lost, especially on astrology and antiquities. He died in the hometown in 1551.

His main treatise on astrology, Coelum sydereum, was published posthumously in Como in 1699, a century after it was written. This work in seven books is a large discussion of the influence and effectiveness of the constellations. According to Cigalini, "the operations of the stars are according to nature, not according to mathematics."

== Works ==
- Coelum sydereum. Apologia de numero, & motibus corporum coelest. et Volturrenus de mathematica praesensione (in Latin). Como: Nicolaus Caprani. 1655.

== See also ==
- Gerolamo Cardano
