= Quartic equation =

Polynomial equation of degree 4

In mathematics, a quartic equation is one which can be expressed as a quartic function equaling zero. The general form of a quartic equation is

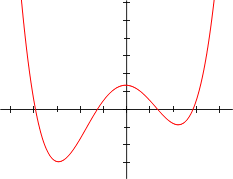
Graph of a polynomial function of degree 4, with its 4 roots and 3 critical points.

$$ax^4+bx^3+cx^2+dx+e=0 \,$$

where a ≠ 0.

The quartic is the highest order polynomial equation that can be solved by radicals in the general case.

== History ==
Lodovico Ferrari is attributed with the discovery of the solution to the quartic in 1540, but since this solution, like all algebraic solutions of the quartic, requires the solution of a cubic to be found, it could not be published immediately. The solution of the quartic was published together with that of the cubic by Ferrari's mentor Gerolamo Cardano in the book Ars Magna (1545).

The proof that this was the highest order general polynomial for which such solutions could be found was first given in the Abel–Ruffini theorem in 1824, proving that all attempts at solving the higher order polynomials would be futile. The notes left by Évariste Galois before his death in a duel in 1832 later led to an elegant complete theory of the roots of polynomials, of which this theorem was one result.

== Special case solutions ==
Consider a quartic equation expressed in the form $a_0x^4+a_1x^3+a_2x^2+a_3x+a_4=0$:

There exists a general formula for finding the roots to quartic equations, provided the coefficient of the leading term is non-zero. However, since the general method is quite complex and susceptible to errors in execution, it is better to apply one of the special cases listed below if possible.

=== Degenerate case ===
If the constant term a_{4} = 0, then one of the roots is x = 0, and the other roots can be found by dividing by x, and solving the resulting cubic equation,

$$a_0x^3+a_1x^2+a_2x+a_3=0. \,$$

=== Evident roots: 1 and −1 and −k ===
Call our quartic polynomial Q(x). Since 1 raised to any power is 1,

$$Q(1) = a_0 + a_1 + a_2 + a_3 + a_4 \ .$$

Thus if $\ a_0 + a_1 + a_2 + a_3 + a_4 = 0\ ,$ Q(1) = 0 and so x = 1 is a root of Q(x). It can similarly be shown that if $\ a_0 + a_2 + a_4 = a_1 + a_3 \ ,$ x = −1 is a root.

In either case the full quartic can then be divided by the factor (x − 1) or (x + 1) respectively yielding a new cubic polynomial, which can be solved to find the quartic's other roots.

If $\ a_1 = a_0 k\ ,$ $\ a_2 = 0\$ and $\ a_4= a_3 k\ ,$ then $\ x = -k\$ is a root of the equation. The full quartic can then be factorized this way:

$$\ a_0 x^4 + a_0 k x^3 + a_3 x + a_3 k = a_0 x^3 (x + k) + a_3 (x + k) = (a_0 x^3 + a_3) (x + k) \ .$$

Alternatively, if $\ a_1 = a_0 k\ ,$ $\ a_3 = a_2 k\ ,$ and $\ a_4 = 0\ ,$ then x = 0 and x = −k become two known roots. Q(x) divided by x(x + k) is a quadratic polynomial.

=== Biquadratic equations ===
A quartic equation where a_{3} and a_{1} are equal to 0 takes the form

$$a_0x^4+a_2x^2+a_4=0\,\!$$

and thus is a biquadratic equation, which is easy to solve: let $z=x^2$, so our equation becomes

$$a_0z^2+a_2z+a_4=0\,\!$$

which is a simple quadratic equation, whose solutions are easily found using the quadratic formula:

$$z=\frac{-a_2\pm\sqrt{a_2^2-4a_0a_4}}{2a_0} \,\!$$

When we've solved it (i.e. found these two z values), we can extract x from them

$$x_1=+\sqrt{z_+}\,\!$$
$$x_2=-\sqrt{z_+}\,\!$$
$$x_3=+\sqrt{z_-}\,\!$$
$$x_4=-\sqrt{z_-}\,\!$$

If either of the z solutions were negative or complex numbers, then some of the x solutions are complex numbers.

=== Quasi-symmetric equations ===
$$a_0x^4+a_1x^3+a_2x^2+a_1 m x+a_0 m^2=0 \,$$

Steps:

1. Divide by x^{2}.
2. Use variable change z = x + m/x.
3. So, z^{2} = x^{2} + (m/x)^{2} + 2m.

This leads to:

$$a_0(x^2+m^2/x^2) + a_1(x+m/x) + a_2=0$$,
$$a_0(z^2-2m) + a_1(z) + a_2=0$$,
$a_0z^2 + a_1 z + (a_2-2 m a_0) = 0$ (a quadratic in z = x + m/x)

=== Multiple roots ===
If the quartic has a double root, it can be found by taking the polynomial greatest common divisor with its derivative. Then they can be divided out and the resulting quadratic equation solved.

In general, there exist only four possible cases of quartic equations with multiple roots, which are listed below:

1. Multiplicity-4 (M4): when the general quartic equation can be expressed as $a(x-l)^4=0$, for some real number $l$. This case can always be reduced to a biquadratic equation.
2. Multiplicity-3 (M3): when the general quartic equation can be expressed as $a(x-l)^3 (x-m)=0$, where $l$ and $m$ are two different real numbers. This is the only case that can never be reduced to a biquadratic equation.
3. Double Multiplicity-2 (DM2): when the general quartic equation can be expressed as $a(x-l)^2 (x-m)^2=0$, where $l$ and $m$ are two different real numbers or a pair of non-real complex conjugate numbers. This case can also always be reduced to a biquadratic equation.
4. Single Multiplicity-2 (SM2): when the general quartic equation can be expressed as $a(x-l)^2 (x-m)(x-n)=0$, where $l$, $m$, and $n$ are three different real numbers or $l$ is a real number and $m$ and $n$ are a pair of non-real complex conjugate numbers. This case is divided into two subcases, those that can be reduced to a biquadratic equation and those that can't.

Consider the case in which the three non-monic coefficients of the depressed quartic equation, $x^4 + p x^2 + q x + r = 0$, can be expressed in terms of the five coefficients of the general quartic equation as follows:

$$p=\frac{8ac-3b^2}{8a^2}$$
$$q=\frac{b^3-4abc+8a^2 d}{8a^3}$$
$$r=\frac{16ab^2 c-64a^2 bd-3b^4+256a^3 e}{256a^4}$$,

Then, the criteria to identify a priori each case of quartic equations with multiple roots and their respective solutions are shown below.

- M4. The general quartic equation corresponds to this case whenever $p=q=r=0$, so the four roots of this equation are given as follows:

$$x_1=x_2=x_3=x_4=-\frac{b}{4a}$$.

- M3. The general quartic equation corresponds to this case whenever $p^2=-12r>0$ and $27q^2=-8p^3>0$, so the four roots of this equation are given as follows if $q>0$:

$$x_1=x_2=x_3=\sqrt{-\frac{p}{6}}-\frac{b}{4a}$$
$$x_4=-\sqrt{-\frac{3p}{2}}-\frac{b}{4a}$$

Otherwise, if $q\le0$:

$$x_1=x_2=x_3=-\sqrt{-\frac{p}{6}}-\frac{b}{4a}$$
$$x_4=\sqrt{-\frac{3p}{2}}-\frac{b}{4a}$$.

- DM2. The general quartic equation corresponds to this case whenever $p^2=4r>0=q$, so the four roots of this equation are given as follows:

$x_1=x_3=\sqrt{-\frac{p}{2}}-\frac{b}{4a}$
$$x_2=x_4=-\sqrt{-\frac{p}{2}}-\frac{b}{4a}$$.

- Biquadratic SM2. The general quartic equation corresponds to this subcase of the SM2 equations whenever $p\neq q=r=0$, so the four roots of this equation are given as follows:

$$x_1=x_2=-\frac{b}{4a}$$
$x_3=\sqrt{-p}-\frac{b}{4a}$
$$x_4=-\sqrt{-p}-\frac{b}{4a}$$.

- Non-Biquadratic SM2. The general quartic equation corresponds to this subcase of the SM2 equations whenever $(p^2+12r)^3=[p(p^2-36r)+\frac{27}{2} q^2 ]^2>0\neq {q}$, so the four roots of this equation are given by the following formula:

$$x=\frac{1}{2} \left [ \xi\sqrt{s_1}\pm\sqrt{2\biggl(s_2-\frac{\xi q}{\sqrt{s_1}}\biggr)} \right ]-\frac{b}{4a}$$,

where:

$$s_1=\frac{9q^2-32pr}{p^2+12r}>0$$
$$s_2=-\frac{2p(p^2-4r)+9q^2}{2(p^2+12r)}\neq 0$$
$$\xi = \pm 1$$.

== The general case ==
The quartic formula fully written out in terms of the coefficients of the quartic, for the monic case. Because of its unwieldy nature, it is generally given in terms of auxiliary variables first computed from the coefficients.

To begin, the quartic must first be converted to a depressed quartic.

=== Converting to a depressed quartic ===
Let

$\ A x^4 + B x^3 + C x^2 + D x + E = 0 \$	1'

be the general quartic equation which it is desired to solve. Divide both sides by A,

$$\ x^4 + {B \over A} x^3 + {C \over A} x^2 + {D \over A} x + {E \over A} = 0 \ .$$

The first step, if B is not already zero, should be to eliminate the x^{3} term. To do this, change variables from x to u, such that

$$\ x = u - {B \over 4 A} \ .$$

Then

$$\ \left( u - {B \over 4 A} \right)^4 + {B \over A} \left( u - {B \over 4 A} \right)^3 + {C \over A} \left( u - {B \over 4 A} \right)^2 + {D \over A} \left( u - {B \over 4 A} \right) + {E \over A} = 0 \ .$$

Expanding the powers of the binomials produces

$$\ \left( u^4 - {B \over A} u^3 + {6 u^2 B^2 \over 16 A^2} - {4 u B^3 \over 64 A^3} + {B^4 \over 256 A^4} \right)
+ {B \over A}
\left( u^3 - {3 u^2 B \over 4 A} + {3 u B^2 \over 16 A^2} - {B^3 \over 64 A^3} \right)
+ {C \over A}
\left( u^2 - {u B \over 2 A} + {B^2 \over 16 A^2} \right) + {D \over A} \left( u - {B \over 4 A} \right) + {E \over A} = 0 \ .$$

Collecting the same powers of u yields

$$\ u^4 + \left( {-3 B^2 \over 8 A^2} + {C \over A} \right) u^2 + \left( {B^3 \over 8 A^3} - {B C \over 2 A^2} + {D \over A} \right) u + \left( {-3 B^4 \over 256 A^4} + {C B^2 \over 16 A^3} - {B D \over 4 A^2} + {E \over A} \right) = 0 \ .$$

Now rename the coefficients of u. Let

$$\begin{align}
a & = {-3 B^2 \over 8 A^2} + {C \over A}\ ,\\
b & = {B^3 \over 8 A^3} - {B C \over 2 A^2} + {D \over A}\ ,\\
c & = {-3 B^4 \over 256 A^4} + {C B^2 \over 16 A^3} - {B D \over 4 A^2} + {E \over A}\ .
\end{align}$$

The resulting equation is

$\ u^4 + a u^2 + b u + c = 0 \$	1

which is a depressed quartic equation.

If $\ b = 0 \$ then we have the special case of a biquadratic equation, which is easily solved, as explained above. Note that the general solution, given below, will not work for the special case $\ b = 0 \ .$ The equation must be solved as a biquadratic.

In either case, once the depressed quartic is solved for u, substituting those values into

$$\ x = u - {B \over 4 A} \$$

produces the values for x that solve the original quartic.

=== Solving a depressed quartic when b ≠ 0 ===
After converting to a depressed quartic equation

$$u^4 + a u^2 + b u + c = 0$$

and excluding the special case b = 0, which is solved as a biquadratic, we assume from here on that b ≠ 0 .

We will separate the terms left and right as

$$u^4 = - a u^2 - b u - c$$

and add in terms to both sides which make them both into perfect squares.

Let y be any solution of this cubic equation:

$$2 y^3 - a y^2 - 2 c y + ( a c - \tfrac14 b^2 ) = ( 2 y - a ) ( y^2 - c )  - \tfrac14 b^2 = 0 \ .$$

Then (since b ≠ 0)

$$2 y - a \neq 0$$

so we may divide by it, giving

$$y^2 - c = \frac{ b^2 }{ 4 ( 2 y - a ) } \ .$$

Then

$$( u^2 + y )^2 = u^4 + 2 y u^2 + y^2 = ( 2 y - a ) u^2 - b u + ( y^2 - c ) = ( 2 y - a ) u^2 - b u + \frac{ b^2 }{\ 4 ( 2 y - a )\ } = \left( \sqrt{ 2 y - a\ } \, u - \frac{ b }{ 2 \sqrt{ 2 y - a\ } } \right)^2 \ .$$

Subtracting, we get the difference of two squares which is the product of the sum and difference of their roots

$$( u^2 + y )^2 - \left( \sqrt{ 2 y - a\ } \, u - \frac{ b }{ 2 \sqrt{ 2 y - a\ } } \right)^2 = \left( u^2 + y + \sqrt{ 2 y - a\ } \, u - \frac{ b }{ 2 \sqrt{ 2 y - a\ } } \right) \left( u^2 + y - \sqrt{ 2 y - a\ } \, u + \frac{ b }{ 2 \sqrt{ 2 y - a\ } } \right) = 0$$

which can be solved by applying the quadratic formula to each of the two factors. So the possible values of u are:

$$u = \tfrac12 \left( - \sqrt{ 2 y - a\ } + \sqrt{ -2 y - a + \frac{ 2 b }{ \sqrt{ 2 y - a\ } }\ } \right) \ ,$$
$$u = \tfrac12 \left( - \sqrt{ 2 y - a\ } - \sqrt{ -2 y - a + \frac{ 2 b }{ \sqrt{ 2 y - a\ } }\ } \right) \ ,$$
$u = \tfrac12 \left( \sqrt{ 2 y - a\ } + \sqrt{ -2 y - a - \frac{ 2 b }{ \sqrt{ 2 y - a\ } }\ } \right) \ ,$ or
$$u = \tfrac12 \left( \sqrt{ 2 y - a\ } - \sqrt{ -2 y - a - \frac{ 2 b }{ \sqrt{ 2 y - a\ } }\ } \right) \ .$$

Using another y from among the three roots of the cubic simply causes these same four values of u to appear in a different order. The solutions of the cubic are:

$$\ y = \frac{a}{6} + w - \frac{p}{3 w}\$$
$$\ w = \sqrt[3]{- \frac{q}{2} + \sqrt{ \frac{q^2}{4} + \frac{p^3}{27}\ }\ }$$

using any one of the three possible cube roots. A wise strategy is to choose the sign of the square-root that makes the absolute value of w as large as possible.

$$\ p = - \frac{a^2}{12} - c \ ,$$
$$\ q = - \frac{a^3}{108} + \frac{a c}{3} - \frac{b^2}{8} \ .$$

=== Ferrari's solution ===
Otherwise, the depressed quartic can be solved by means of a method discovered by Lodovico Ferrari. Once the depressed quartic has been obtained, the next step is to add the valid identity

$$\left(u^2 + a\right)^2 - u^4 - 2 a u^2 = a^2$$

to equation (1), yielding

$\left(u^2 + a\right)^2 + b u + c = a u^2 + a^2.$	2

The effect has been to fold up the u^{4} term into a perfect square: (u^{2} + a)^{2}. The second term, au^{2}, did not disappear, but its sign has changed and it has been moved to the right side.

The next step is to insert a variable y into the perfect square on the left side of equation (2), and a corresponding 2y into the coefficient of u^{2} in the right side. To accomplish these insertions, the following valid formulas will be added to equation (2),

$$\begin{align}
(u^2+a+y)^2-(u^2+a)^2 & = 2y(u^2+a)+ y^2\ \
\\
& = 2yu^2+2ya+y^2,
\end{align}$$

and

$$0 = (a + 2 y) u^2 - 2 y u^2 - a u^2\,$$

These two formulas, added together, produce

$$\left(u^2 + a + y\right)^2 - \left(u^2 + a\right)^2 = \left(a + 2 y\right) u^2 - a u^2 + 2 y a + y^2 \qquad \qquad (y\hbox{-insertion})\,$$

which added to equation (2) produces

$$\left(u^2 + a + y\right)^2 + b u + c = \left(a + 2 y\right) u^2 + \left(2 y a + y^2 + a^2\right).\,$$

This is equivalent to

$(u^2 + a + y)^2 = (a + 2 y) u^2 - b u + (y^2 + 2 y a + a^2 - c).$	3

The objective now is to choose a value for y such that the right side of equation (3) becomes a perfect square. This can be done by letting the discriminant of the quadratic function become zero. To explain this, first expand a perfect square so that it equals a quadratic function:

$$\left(s u + t\right)^2 = \left(s^2\right) u^2 + \left(2 s t\right) u + \left(t^2\right).\,$$

The quadratic function on the right side has three coefficients. It can be verified that squaring the second coefficient and then subtracting four times the product of the first and third coefficients yields zero:

$$\left(2 s t\right)^2 - 4 \left(s^2\right) \left(t^2\right) = 0.\,$$

Therefore, to make the right side of equation (3) into a perfect square, the following equation must be solved:

$$(-b)^2 - 4 \left(2 y + a\right) \left(y^2 + 2 y a + a^2 - c\right) = 0.\,$$

Multiply the binomial with the polynomial,

$$b^2 - 4 \left(2 y^3 + 5 a y^2 + \left(4 a^2 - 2 c\right) y + \left(a^3 - a c\right)\right) = 0\,$$

Divide both sides by −4, and move the −b^{2}/4 to the right,

$$2 y^3 + 5 a y^2
+ \left( 4 a^2 - 2 c \right) y
+ \left( a^3 - a c - \frac{b^2}{4} \right)
= 0$$

Divide both sides by 2,

$y^3 + \frac{5}{2} a y^2 + \left(2 a^2 - c\right) y + \left( {a^3 \over 2} - {a c \over 2} - {b^2 \over 8} \right) = 0.$	4

This is a cubic equation in y. Solve for y using any method for solving such equations (e.g. conversion to a reduced cubic and application of Cardano's formula). Any of the three possible roots will do.

==== Folding the second perfect square ====
With the value for $y$ so selected, it is now known that the right side of equation (3) is a perfect square of the form

$\left(s^2\right)u^2 + (2st)u + \left(t^2\right) = \left(\left(\sqrt{s^2}\right)u + {(2st) \over 2\sqrt{s^2}}\right)^2$

(This is correct for both signs of square root, as long as the same sign is taken for both square roots. A ± is redundant, as it would be absorbed by another ± a few equations further down this page.)

so that it can be folded:

$(a + 2 y) u^2 + (- b) u + \left(y^2 + 2 y a + a^2 - c \right) = \left( \left(\sqrt{a + 2y}\right)u + {(-b) \over 2\sqrt{a + 2 y}} \right)^2.$

Note: If $b\neq 0$ then $a + 2y \neq 0$. If $b = 0$ then this would be a biquadratic equation, which we solved earlier.

Therefore, equation (3) becomes

$\left(u^2 + a + y\right)^2 = \left( \left(\sqrt{a + 2 y}\right)u - {b \over 2\sqrt{a + 2 y}} \right)^2.$	5

Equation (5) has a pair of folded perfect squares, one on each side of the equation. The two perfect squares balance each other.

If two squares are equal, then the sides of the two squares are also equal, as shown by:

$\left(u^2 + a + y\right) = \pm\left( \left(\sqrt{a + 2 y}\right)u - {b \over 2\sqrt{a + 2 y}} \right).$	5'

Collecting like powers of $u$ produces

$u^2 + \left(\mp_s \sqrt{a + 2 y}\right)u + \left( a + y \pm_s {b \over 2\sqrt{a + 2 y}} \right) = 0.$	6

Note: The subscript $s$ of $\pm_s$ and $\mp_s$ is to note that they are dependent.

Equation (6) is a quadratic equation for $u$. Its solution is

$$u=\frac{\pm_s\sqrt{a + 2 y} \pm_t \sqrt{(a + 2y) - 4\left(a + y \pm_s {b \over 2\sqrt{a + 2 y}}\right)}}{2}.$$

Simplifying, one gets

$$u={\pm_s\sqrt{a + 2 y} \pm_t \sqrt{-\left(3a + 2y \pm_s {2b \over \sqrt{a + 2 y}} \right)} \over 2}.$$

This is the solution of the depressed quartic, therefore the solutions of the original quartic equation are

$x=-{B \over 4A} + {\pm_s\sqrt{a + 2 y} \pm_t \sqrt{-\left(3a + 2y \pm_s {2b \over \sqrt{a + 2 y}} \right)} \over 2}.$	6'

Remember: The two $\pm_s$ come from the same place in equation (5'), and should both have the same sign, while the sign of $\pm_t$ is independent.

==== Summary of Ferrari's method ====
Given the quartic equation

$$A x^4 + B x^3 + C x^2 + D x + E = 0, \,$$

its solution can be found by means of the following calculations:

$$a = - {3 B^2 \over 8 A^2} + {C \over A},$$

$$b = {B^3 \over 8 A^3} - {B C \over 2 A^2} + {D \over A},$$

$$c = - {3 B^4 \over 256 A^4} + {C B^2 \over 16 A^3} - {B D \over 4 A^2} + {E \over A}.$$

If $\,b=0,$ then

$$x=-{B\over 4A}\pm_s\sqrt{-a\pm_t\sqrt{a^2-4c}\over 2}\qquad \mbox{(for } b=0 \mbox{ only)}.$$

Otherwise, continue with

$$P = - {a^2 \over 12} - c,$$

$$Q = - {a^3 \over 108} + {a c \over 3} - {b^2 \over 8},$$

$$R = -{Q\over 2} \pm \sqrt{{Q^{2}\over 4}+{P^{3}\over 27}},$$

(either sign of the square root will do)

$$U = \sqrt[3]{R},$$

(there are 3 complex roots, any one of them will do)

$$y = - {5 \over 6} a + \begin{cases}U=0 &\to -\sqrt[3]{Q}\\U\ne 0, &\to U - {P\over 3U} ,\end{cases} \quad\quad\quad$$

$$W=\sqrt{ a + 2 y}$$

$$x = - {B \over 4 A} + { \pm_s  W \pm_t \sqrt{-\left(3a + 2 y \pm_s {2b\over W} \right) }\over 2 }.$$

The two ±_{s} must have the same sign, the ±_{t} is independent. To get all roots, compute x for (±_{s},±_{t}) = (+,+); (+,−); (−,+); (−,−). This formula handles repeated roots without problem.

Ferrari was the first to discover one of these labyrinthine solutions. The equation which he solved was

$$x^4 + 6 x^2 - 60 x + 36 = 0$$

which was already in depressed form. It has a pair of solutions which can be found with the set of formulas shown above.

==== Numerical example ====
Consider the quartic equation

$x^4-4x^3+78x^2+28x-595=0.$

Comparing this equation with the general form $Ax^4+Bx^3+Cx^2+Dx+E=0$, the coefficients are

$A=1,\quad B=-4,\quad C=78,\quad D=28,\quad E=-595.$

Using the formulas above, calculate the coefficients of the depressed quartic:

$$\begin{align}
a&=-\frac{3(-4)^2}{8}+78=72,\\
b&=\frac{(-4)^3}{8}-\frac{(-4)(78)}{2}+28=176,\\
c&=-\frac{3(-4)^4}{256}
+\frac{78(-4)^2}{16}
-\frac{(-4)(28)}{4}-595=-492.
\end{align}$$

Since $b\ne0$, continue with the general case. The auxiliary quantities are

$$\begin{align}
P&=-\frac{72^2}{12}-(-492)=60,\\
Q&=-\frac{72^3}{108}
+\frac{72(-492)}{3}
-\frac{176^2}{8}=-19136.
\end{align}$$

Choosing the positive sign in the expression for $R$ gives

$$\begin{align}
R&=-\frac{Q}{2}+
\sqrt{\frac{Q^2}{4}+\frac{P^3}{27}}\\
&=9568+2088\sqrt{21}.
\end{align}$$

Taking the real cube root,

$U=\sqrt[3]{R}=13+3\sqrt{21}.$

The value of $y$ is therefore

$$\begin{align}
y&=-\frac{5}{6}a+U-\frac{P}{3U}\\
&=-60+(13+3\sqrt{21})
-\frac{20}{13+3\sqrt{21}}\\
&=-34.
\end{align}$$

Next, calculate

$W=\sqrt{a+2y}=\sqrt{72-68}=2.$

Finally, substituting these values into the formula for $x$ gives

$$\begin{align}
x&=-\frac{-4}{4}
+\frac{\pm_s 2\pm_t
\sqrt{-\left(148\pm_s176\right)}}{2}.
\end{align}$$

Taking the four possible combinations of signs, where the two $\pm_s$ signs are dependent and $\pm_t$ is independent, gives the four roots:

$$\begin{align}
x_1&=\sqrt{7}\\
x_2&=-\sqrt{7}\\
x_3&=2+9i\\
x_4&=2-9i.
\end{align}$$

Indeed, the original quartic can be factorised as
$$(x^2-7)(x^2-4x+85)=0,$$
confirming the four solutions.

=== Ferrari's solution in the special case of real coefficients ===
If the coefficients of the quartic equation are real then the nested depressed cubic equation (5) also has real coefficients, thus it has at least one real root.

Furthermore, the cubic function

$$C(v) = v^3 + P v + Q,$$

where P and Q are given by (5) has the properties that

$C\left({a \over 3}\right) = {-b^2 \over 8} < 0$ and

$\lim_{v\to \infty} C(v) = \infty,$ where $a$ and $b$ are given by (1).

This means that (5) has a real root greater than $a \over 3$, and therefore that (4) has a real root greater than $-a \over 2$.

Using this root the term $\sqrt{a + 2 y}$ in (6) is always real, which ensures that the two quadratic equations (6) have real coefficients.

=== Obtaining alternative solutions the hard way ===
It could happen that one only obtained one solution through the formulae above, because not all four sign patterns are tried for four solutions, and the solution obtained is complex. It may also be the case that one is only looking for a real solution. Let $x$_{1} denote the complex solution. If all the original coefficients $A$, $B$, $C$, $D$ and $E$ are real—which should be the case when one desires only real solutions – then there is another complex solution $x$_{2} which is the complex conjugate of $x$_{1}. If the other two roots are denoted as $x$_{3} and $x$_{4} then the quartic equation can be expressed as

$$(x - x_1) (x - x_2) (x - x_3) (x - x_4) = 0, \,$$

but this quartic equation is equivalent to the product of two quadratic equations:

$(x - x_1) (x - x_2) = 0$	9

and

$(x - x_3) (x - x_4) = 0.$	10

Since

$$x_2 = x_1^\star$$

then

$$\begin{align}
(x-x_1)(x-x_2)&=x^2-(x_1+x_1^\star)x+x_1x_1^\star \\
&=x^2-2\operatorname{Re}(x_1)x+[\operatorname{Re}(x_1)]^2+[\operatorname{Im}(x_1)]^2.
\end{align}$$

Let

$$a = - 2\operatorname{Re}(x_1),$$
$$b = \left[ \operatorname{Re}( x_1) \right]^{2} + \left[ \operatorname{Im}(x_1) \right]^{2}$$

so that equation (9) becomes

$x^2 + a x + b = 0.$	11

Also let there be (unknown) variables w and v such that equation (10) becomes

$x^2 + w x + v = 0.$	12

Multiplying equations (11) and (12) produces

$x^4 + (a + w) x^3 + (b + w a + v) x^2 + (w b + v a) x + v b = 0.$	13

Comparing equation (13) to the original quartic equation, it can be seen that

$$a + w = {B \over A},$$
$$b + w a + v = {C \over A},$$
$$w b + v a = {D \over A},$$

and

$$v b = {E \over A}.$$

Therefore

$$w = {B \over A} - a = {B \over A} + 2 \operatorname{Re}(x_1),$$
$$v = {E \over A b} = \frac{E}{A \left( \left[ \operatorname{Re}(x_1) \right]^2 + \left[ \operatorname{Im}(x_1) \right]^2 \right) }.$$

Equation (12) can be solved for x yielding

$$x_3 = {-w + \sqrt{w^2 - 4 v} \over 2},$$
$$x_4 = {-w - \sqrt{w^2 - 4 v} \over 2}.$$

One of these two solutions should be the desired real solution.

== Alternative methods ==
=== Resolvent cubic ===
Resolvent cubic shows how a resolvent cubic equation may be used to find the roots of a monic depressed quartic equation by finding the roots of two quadratic equations. Particularly simple is the Third Definition. Let

$$\begin{align}
x^4+c\,x^2+d\,x+e & = (x^2+p\,x+q)\,(x^2-p\,x+s) \\
& = x^4+(s+q-p^2)\,x^2 + p\,(s-q)\, x + q\,s \quad \Rightarrow
\end{align}$$

$$p^2+c=s+q\quad \quad \frac{d}{p}=s-q \quad \quad e=q\,s \quad \Rightarrow$$

$$(p^2+c)^2-\left(\frac{d}{p}\right)^2=4\,e$$

This cubic equation in $p^2$ is known as Descartes' Resolvent. There are three ways to partition the four roots of the quartic equation into two pairs of roots and then two ways for each to order the quadratics ($\pm p$). Add and subtract the first two coefficient equations to get q and s.

=== Möbius transformation method ===
A suitably chosen Möbius transformation can transform a quartic equation into a quadratic equation in the new variable squared. This is a known method.

Finding such a Möbius transformation involves solving a cubic equation and so simplifies the problem. For example, start with the depressed quartic equation with unity leading coefficient and with neither $a_1$ nor $a_0$ equal to zero:

$$x^4+a_2x^2+a_1x+a_0=0$$

and do the Möbius transformation:

$$x=\frac{A+By}{1+y}$$

Set the first and third order coefficients of the resulting quartic equation in $y$ to zero. After some algebra, one finds $A+B$ is to be obtained from the cubic equation

$$a_1(A+B)^3+(4a_0-2a_1a_2-{a_2}^2)(A+B)^2-2a_1a_2(A+B)-{a_1}^2=0$$

and, regarding $A+B$ as known, $A$ is to be obtained from the quadratic equation

$$2(A+B)A^2-2(A+B)^2A-a_2(A+B)-a_1=0$$

Solving the resulting quadratic equation for $y^2$ gives two values for $y^2$ and each square root of $y^2$ has two values, giving a total of four solutions, as expected.

The cubic equation in $\textbf A + \textbf B$ given earlier is the same as $P^2-Q(A+B)^2=0$, where

$$P \equiv \frac{b_1-b_3}{2(A-B)}=2\,A\,B\,(A+B)+a_2(A+B)+a_1$$

$$Q \equiv \frac{B\,b_1-A\,b_3}{A-B}=4A^2B^2-a_1(A+B)-4a_0=0$$

Here b_{i} are the coefficients of the quartic polynomial in y. This shows how this equation was obtained.

=== Galois theory and factorization ===
The symmetric group S_{4} on four elements has the Klein four-group as a normal subgroup. This suggests using a resolvent whose roots may be variously described as a discrete Fourier transform or a Hadamard matrix transform of the roots. Suppose r_{i} for i from 0 to 3 are roots of

$$x^4 + bx^3 + cx^2 + dx + e = 0\qquad (1)$$

If we now set

$$\begin{align}
s_0 &= \tfrac12(r_0 + r_1 + r_2 + r_3), \\
s_1 &= \tfrac12(r_0 - r_1 + r_2 - r_3), \\
s_2 &= \tfrac12(r_0 + r_1 - r_2 - r_3), \\
s_3 &= \tfrac12(r_0 - r_1 - r_2 + r_3),
\end{align}$$

then since the transformation is an involution, we may express the roots in terms of the four s_{i} in exactly the same way. Since we know the value s_{0} = −b/2, we really only need the values for s_{1}, s_{2} and s_{3}. These we may find by expanding the polynomial

$$\left(z^2 - s_1^2\right)\left(z^2-s_2^2\right)\left(z^2-s_3^2\right)\qquad (2)$$

which if we make the simplifying assumption that b = 0, is equal to

$$z^6 + 2cz^4 + \left(c^2-4e\right) z^2 - d^2 \qquad(3)$$

This polynomial is of degree six, but only of degree three in z^{2}, and so the corresponding equation is solvable. By trial we can determine which three roots are the correct ones, and hence find the solutions of the quartic.

We can remove any requirement for trial by using a root of the same resolvent polynomial for factoring; if w is any root of (3), and if

$$F_1 = x^2+wx+\frac 1 2 w^2+\frac 1 2 c - \frac 1 2\cdot \frac {c^2 w}{d}-\frac 1 2 \cdot\frac {w^5}{d} - \frac{cw^3}{d} + 2\frac {ew}{d}$$
$$F_2 = x^2-wx + \frac 1 2 w^2 + \frac 1 2 c + \frac 1 2\cdot \frac{w^5}{d} + \frac {cw^3}{d} - 2\frac {ew}{d} + \frac 1 2\cdot \frac {c^2 w}{d}$$

then

$$F_1 F_2 = x^4 + cx^2 + dx + e\qquad\qquad (4)$$

We therefore can solve the quartic by solving for w and then solving for the roots of the two factors using the quadratic formula.

=== Approximate methods ===
The methods described above are, in principle, exact root-finding methods. It is also possible to use successive approximation methods which iteratively converge towards the roots, such as the Durand–Kerner method.

== See also ==
- Linear equation
- Quadratic equation
- Cubic equation
- Quintic equation
- Polynomial
- Newton's method
- Principal equation form
- Resolvent cubic
