= Rafael Bombelli =

16th-century Italian mathematician (1526–1572)

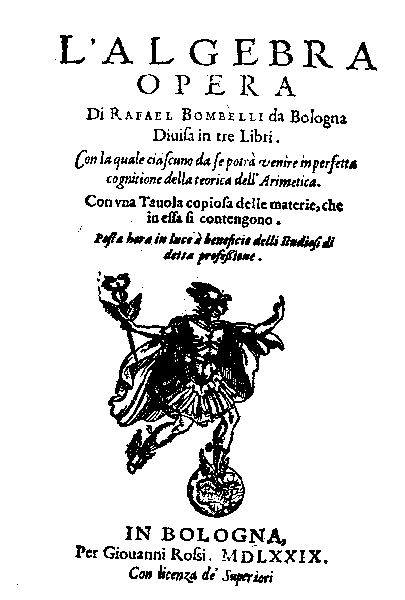
L'Algebra by Rafael Bombelli: frontispiece of the Bologna edition of 1579

Rafael Bombelli (baptised on 20 January 1526; died 1572) (Note: Dates follow the Julian calendar. The Gregorian calendar was adopted in Italy in 1582 (4 October 1582 was followed by 15 October 1582).) was an Italian mathematician. Born in Bologna, he is the author of a treatise on algebra and is a central figure in the understanding of imaginary numbers.

He was the one who finally managed to address the problem with imaginary numbers. In his 1572 book, L'Algebra, Bombelli solved equations using the method of del Ferro/Tartaglia. He introduced the rhetoric that preceded the representative symbols +i and -i and described how they both worked.

== Life ==
Rafael Bombelli was baptised on 20 January 1526 in Bologna, Papal States. He was born to Antonio Mazzoli, a wool merchant, and Diamante Scudieri, a tailor's daughter. The Mazzoli family was once quite powerful in Bologna. When Pope Julius II came to power in 1506, he exiled the ruling family, the Bentivoglios. The Bentivoglio family attempted to retake Bologna in 1508, but failed. Rafael's grandfather participated in the coup attempt and was captured and executed. Later, Antonio was able to return to Bologna, having changed his surname to Bombelli to escape the reputation of the Mazzoli family. Rafael was the oldest of six children. Rafael received no college education, but was instead taught by an engineer-architect by the name of Pier Francesco Clementi.

Bombelli felt that none of the works on algebra by the leading mathematicians of his day provided a careful and thorough exposition of the subject. Instead of another convoluted treatise that only mathematicians could comprehend, Rafael decided to write a book on algebra that could be understood by anyone. His text would be self-contained and easily read by those without higher education.

Bombelli died in 1572 in Rome.

== Bombelli's Algebra ==
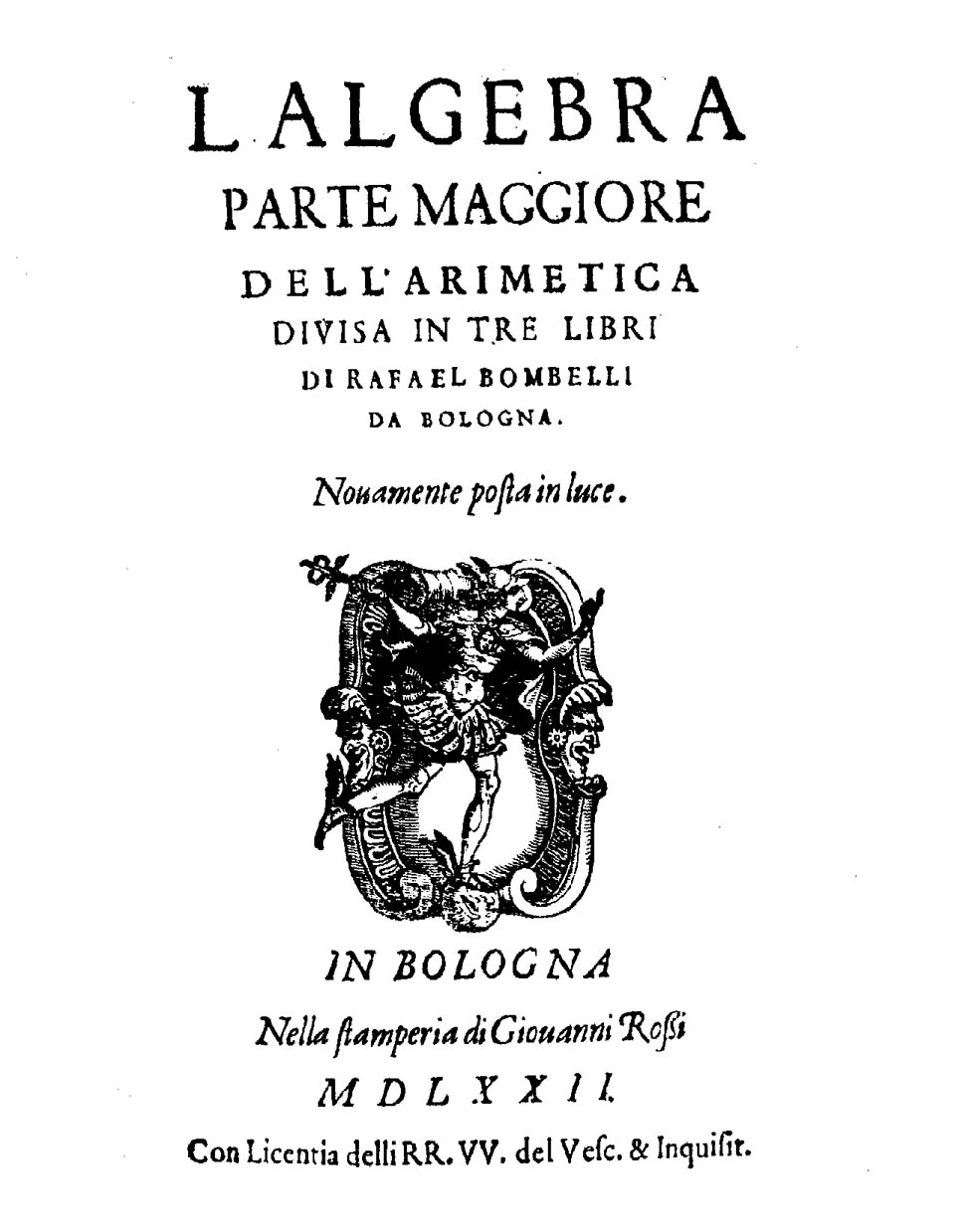
Algebra, 1572

In the book that was published in 1572, entitled Algebra, Bombelli gave a comprehensive account of the algebra known at the time. He was the first European to write down the way of performing computations with negative numbers. The following is an excerpt from the text:

"Plus times plus makes plus
Minus times minus makes plus
Plus times minus makes minus
Minus times plus makes minus
Plus 8 times plus 8 makes plus 64
Minus 5 times minus 6 makes plus 30
Minus 4 times plus 5 makes minus 20
Plus 5 times minus 4 makes minus 20"

As was intended, Bombelli used simple language, as can be seen above, so that anybody could understand it. But at the same time, he was thorough.

=== Notation ===
Bombelli introduced, for the first time in a printed text (in Book II of his Algebra), a form of index notation in which the equation
$x^3 = 6x + 40$
appeared as
1U3 a. 6U1 p. 40.
in which he wrote the U3 as a raised bowl-shape (like the curved part of the capital letter U) with the number 3 above it. Full symbolic notation was developed shortly thereafter by the French mathematician François Viète.

=== Complex numbers ===
Perhaps more importantly than his work with algebra, however, the book also includes Bombelli's monumental contributions to complex number theory. Before he writes about complex numbers, he points out that they occur in solutions of equations of the form $x^3 = ax + b,$ given that $(a/3)^3 > (b/2)^2,$ which is another way of stating that the discriminant of the cubic is negative. The solution of this kind of equation requires taking the cube root of the sum of one number and the square root of some negative number.

Before Bombelli delves into using imaginary numbers practically, he goes into a detailed explanation of the properties of complex numbers. Right away, he makes it clear that the rules of arithmetic for imaginary numbers are not the same as for real numbers. This was a big accomplishment, as even numerous subsequent mathematicians were extremely confused on the topic.

Bombelli avoided confusion by giving a special name to the square roots of negative numbers, instead of just trying to deal with them as regular radicals like other mathematicians did. This made it clear that these numbers were neither positive nor negative. This kind of system avoids the confusion that Euler encountered. Bombelli called the imaginary number i "plus of minus" and used "minus of minus" for -i.

Bombelli had the foresight to see that imaginary numbers were crucial and necessary to solving quartic and cubic equations. At the time, people cared about complex numbers only as tools to solve practical equations. As such, Bombelli was able to get solutions using Scipione del Ferro's rule, even in casus irreducibilis, where other mathematicians such as Cardano had given up.

In his book, Bombelli explains complex arithmetic as follows:

"Plus by plus of minus, makes plus of minus.
Minus by plus of minus, makes minus of minus.
Plus by minus of minus, makes minus of minus.
Minus by minus of minus, makes plus of minus.
Plus of minus by plus of minus, makes minus.
Plus of minus by minus of minus, makes plus.
Minus of minus by plus of minus, makes plus.
Minus of minus by minus of minus makes minus."

After dealing with the multiplication of real and imaginary numbers, Bombelli goes on to talk about the rules of addition and subtraction. He is careful to point out that real parts add to real parts, and imaginary parts add to imaginary parts.

== Reputation ==
Bombelli is generally regarded as the inventor of complex numbers, as no one before him had made rules for dealing with such numbers, and no one believed that working with imaginary numbers would have useful results. Upon reading Bombelli's Algebra, Leibniz praised Bombelli as an ". . . outstanding master of the analytical art." Crossley writes in his book, "Thus we have an engineer, Bombelli, making practical use of complex numbers perhaps because they gave him useful results, while Cardan found the square roots of negative numbers useless. Bombelli is the first to give a treatment of any complex numbers. . . It is remarkable how thorough he is in his presentation of the laws of calculation of complex numbers. . ."

In honour of his accomplishments, a Moon crater was named Bombelli in 1976.

== Bombelli's method of calculating square roots ==
Bombelli used a method related to simple continued fraction to calculate square roots. He did not yet have the concept of a continued fraction, and below is the algorithm of a later version given by Pietro Cataldi (1613).

The method for finding $\sqrt{n}$ begins with $n=(a\pm r)^2=a^2\pm 2ar+r^2\$ with $0<r<1\$, from which it can be shown that $r=\frac{|n-a^2|}{2a\pm r}$. Repeated substitution of the expression on the right-hand side for $r$ into itself yields a continued fraction

$$a\pm \frac{|n-a^2|}{2a\pm \frac{|n-a^2|}{2a\pm \frac{|n-a^2|}{2a\pm \cdots }}}$$

for the root, but Bombelli is more concerned with better approximations for $r$. The value chosen for $a$ is either of the whole numbers whose squares $n$ lies between. The method gives the following convergents for $\sqrt{13}\$ while the actual value is 3.605551275... :

$$3\frac{2}{3},\ 3\frac{3}{5},\ 3\frac{20}{33},\ 3\frac{66}{109},\ 3\frac{109}{180},\ 3\frac{720}{1189},\ \cdots$$

The last convergent equals 3.605550883... . Bombelli's method should be compared with formulas and results used by Heron and Archimedes. The result $\frac{265}{153}<\sqrt{3}<\frac{1351}{780}$ used by Archimedes in his determination of the value of $\pi$ can be found by using 1 and 0 for the initial values of $r$.
