= Fazio Cardano =

Italian jurist and mathematician

Fazio Cardano (1444 – 28 August 1524) was an Italian jurist and mathematician. He was a student of perspective. Cardano was also a professor at the University of Pavia, and was devoted to hermetical science and the world of the occult. He was a friend of Leonardo da Vinci.

It was said that Cardano was always in the company of a familiar spirit who talked to him. This may be a rumour originating from a habit of speaking to himself.

Fazio Cardano was the father of Gerolamo Cardano.
