= Blow book =

The blow book, better known as a magic coloring book in modern variations, is a classic magic trick that has been performed for hundreds of years. It was most popular from the 16th to the 19th century, when variations of the concept were a staple of the book publishing trade. It has been referred to as the oldest example of a manufactured prop used for magic. It remains a common trick today, albeit mostly performed for children, preferably at birthday parties or other events due to the visual nature of the illusion.

== Effect ==
The magician presents a book and riffles through it, showing a number of images in black and white. The book is then closed and a flourish is performed, normally involving audience participation, originally having an audience member blow on the outside of the book. The magician picks up the book and riffles it again, revealing that the images are now colored, or have changed completely into different images depending on the nature of the book.

== History ==
The blow book is one of the oldest magic tricks. It has a history that is well-documented in historical sources, because the trick is based on a device that was only really practical after the widespread introduction of the printing press in 1450, which created a market for inexpensive paper and binding that the trick relies upon.

The earliest known mention of the concept was by Gerolamo Cardano in 1550, who described the trick by mentioning "conjurors show different and always unlike pictures in one and the same book". Another early mention is by Reginald Scot in his book The Discoverie of Witchcraft, published in 1584. This work examined witchcraft and revealed the tricks involved, ultimately concluding that witchcraft was not real. As part of this discussion he mentions the use of blow books, and goes on to describe how to prepare a book that the magician would then "whew you everie leafe to be painted with birds, then with beasts, then with serpents, then with angels, etc." He realized that the preparation might be beyond the capabilities of many would-be magicians, and directs his readers to "buie for a small value the like booke, at the shop of W. Brome in Powles churchyard", the earliest known example of a magic prop for sale. William Broome of St. Paul's in London was active between 1577 and 1591. A similar description of the blow book was published in French the same year by Jean Prévost.

The blow book is mentioned in Hocus Pocus Junior, the earliest known collection of magic tricks in the English language, published in London in 1635. In this text the concept is called a "iugling booke" ("juggling book") or "booke for Waggery". It contains a complete description of how to prepare a blow book. The author suggests presenting the book by saying "this booke is not painted thus as some of you may suppose, but it is of such a property, that whosoever bloweth on it, it wil give the representation of whatsoever he is naturally addicted unto". He further mentions that in order for the trick to work, one must use a "bold and audacious countenance, for that must be the grace of all your trickes". Many of the tricks in the book feature the magician or an audience member blowing on the prop; this was a common fixture of the trade. The trick continues to appear in many books on magic through time, often with references to where to buy copies; in The Whole Art of Legerdemain of 1748 it's mentioned that "the blowing Books ... may have them at my Shop on little Tower-hill".

None of these very early examples of blow books are known to exist today. The earliest surviving examples are a Belgian version from the 16th century, and French and Italian books from the second half of the 18th century. By the 19th century prices on printed materials had dropped so much that the trick was quite well known, and it was not uncommon for magicians of the period to hand them out after their performances. Quaker Oats even gave out a version in their cereal. The basic concept has never gone out of print for long, and modern examples remain widespread today, along with descriptions on how to make your own. Modern versions are typically in the form of children's coloring books and remain popular, even appearing on The Wiggles.

The mechanical resemblance of the blow book to the early animation concept known as a flip book has been a subject of some consideration in animation circles. Whether the blow book inspired the flip book remains an unanswered question.

== Description ==
The most basic version of the blow book is based on alternating pages being different widths. The book is assembled by alternating the different pages, wide, narrow, wide, narrow (etc.), and then binding them together. Images of one type, black and white for instance, are drawn on every set of facing pages with narrow on the left and wide on the right. The alternate set of images, color in this example, are drawn on the alternate sets of pages with the wide page on the left and narrow on the right. The result is a series of alternating images on sets of facing pages.

To perform the trick, the book is held by the binding in one hand and riffled with the other; for right handed magicians this will normally mean the binding is in the left hand and the riffling is performed with the right hand. By carefully grasping the right side close to the edge, the fingers or thumb are only touching the wider pages, so when the book is riffled two pages flip each time, the wider page under the thumb, and the narrower one on top of it. This way the audience is always seeing the face side of a wide page and the back of a narrow one. To complete the trick, the book is simply riffled with the right hand inverted, or more commonly, by rotating the entire book around its transverse (horizontal) axis while the audience is directed elsewhere. This causes the upper side of the narrow pages to display along with the back of the wider ones. Images drawn on alternating pages are thus shown or hidden depending on where the thumb is placed.

More complex versions of the same basic concept can be used to have multiple sets of pages with different images. In these cases the pages are wider or narrower in a pattern along the entire length of the outer edge, creating a number of "hot spots" where the book can be riffled to cause different pages to appear. Hocus Pocus creates a similar concept by using small pieces of paper pasted to the pages to create the same effect, allowing the magician to grasp the tabs while they riffle. This version allows any number of pages per flip, the Pocus version using sets of eight pages.
