= Cubic equation =

Polynomial equation of degree 3

Graph of a cubic function with 3 real roots (where the curve crosses the horizontal axis at y = 0). The case shown has two critical points. Here the function is $$\begin{align} f(x) &= \frac{1}{4}\left(x^{3} + 3x^{2} - 6x - 8\right) \\ &= \frac{1}{4}(x-2)(x+1)(x+4) \end{align}$$ and therefore the three real roots are 2, −1 and −4.

In algebra, a cubic equation in one variable is an equation of the form
$$ax^3+bx^2+cx+d=0$$
in which a is not zero.

The solutions of this equation are called roots of the cubic function defined by the left-hand side of the equation. If all of the coefficients a, b, c, and d of the cubic equation are real numbers, then it has at least one real root (this is true for all odd-degree polynomial functions). All of the roots of the cubic equation can be found by the following means:

- algebraically: more precisely, they can be expressed by a cubic formula involving the four coefficients, the four basic arithmetic operations, square roots, and cube roots. (This is also true of quadratic (second-degree) and quartic (fourth-degree) equations, but not for higher-degree equations, by the Abel–Ruffini theorem.)
- geometrically: using Omar Khayyam's method.
- trigonometrically
- numerical approximations of the roots can be found using root-finding algorithms such as Newton's method or QR algorithm but the calculation is ill-conditioned in the neighborhoods of repeated roots.

The coefficients do not need to be real numbers. Much of what is covered below is valid for coefficients in any field with characteristic other than 2 and 3. The solutions of the cubic equation do not necessarily belong to the same field as the coefficients. For example, some cubic equations with rational coefficients have roots that are irrational (and even non-real) complex numbers.

== History ==
Cubic equations were known to the ancient Babylonians, Greeks, Chinese, Indians, and Egyptians. Babylonian (20th to 16th centuries BC) cuneiform tablets have been found with tables for calculating cubes and cube roots. The Babylonians could have used the tables to solve cubic equations, but no evidence exists to confirm that they did. The problem of doubling the cube involves the simplest and oldest studied cubic equation, and one for which the ancient Egyptians did not believe a solution existed. In the 5th century BC, Hippocrates reduced this problem to that of finding two mean proportionals between one line and another of twice its length, but could not solve this with a compass and straightedge construction, a task which is now known to be impossible. Methods for solving cubic equations appear in The Nine Chapters on the Mathematical Art, a Chinese mathematical text compiled around the 2nd century BC and commented on by Liu Hui in the 3rd century.

In the 3rd century AD, the Greek mathematician Diophantus found integer or rational solutions for some bivariate cubic equations (Diophantine equations). Hippocrates, Menaechmus and Archimedes are believed to have come close to solving the problem of doubling the cube using intersecting conic sections, though historians such as Reviel Netz dispute whether the Greeks were thinking about cubic equations or just problems that can lead to cubic equations. Some others like T. L. Heath, who translated all of Archimedes's works, disagree, putting forward evidence that Archimedes really solved cubic equations using intersections of two conics, but also discussed the conditions where the roots are 0, 1 or 2.

Graph of the cubic function f(x) = 2x^{3} − 3x^{2} − 3x + 2 = (x + 1) (2x − 1) (x − 2)

In the 7th century, the Tang dynasty astronomer mathematician Wang Xiaotong in his mathematical treatise titled Jigu Suanjing systematically established and solved numerically 25 cubic equations of the form x^{3} + px^{2} + qx = N, 23 of them with p, q ≠ 0, and two of them with q = 0.

In the 11th century, the Persian poet-mathematician, Omar Khayyam (1048–1131), made significant progress in the theory of cubic equations. In an early paper, he discovered that a cubic equation can have more than one solution and stated that it cannot be solved using compass and straightedge constructions. He also found a geometric solution. (Note: In O'Connor, John J.; Robertson, Edmund F., "Omar Khayyam", MacTutor History of Mathematics Archive, University of St Andrews one may read This problem in turn led Khayyam to solve the cubic equation x^{3} + 200x = 20x^{2} + 2000 and he found a positive root of this cubic by considering the intersection of a rectangular hyperbola and a circle. An approximate numerical solution was then found by interpolation in trigonometric tables. The geometric construction was perfectly suitable for Omar Khayyam, as it occurs for solving a problem of geometric construction. At the end of his article he says only that, for this geometrical problem, if approximations are sufficient, then a simpler solution may be obtained by consulting trigonometric tables. Textually: If the seeker is satisfied with an estimate, it is up to him to look into the table of chords of Almagest, or the table of sines and versed sines of Mothmed Observatory. This is followed by a short description of this alternate method (seven lines).) In his later work, the Treatise on Demonstration of Problems of Algebra, he wrote a complete classification of cubic equations with general geometric solutions found by means of intersecting conic sections. Khayyam made an attempt to come up with an algebraic formula for extracting cubic roots. He wrote:

“We have tried to express these roots by algebra but have failed. It may be, however, that men who come after us will succeed.”

In the 12th century, the Indian mathematician Bhaskara II attempted the solution of cubic equations without general success. However, he gave one example of a cubic equation: x^{3} + 12x = 6x^{2} + 35. In the 12th century, another Persian mathematician, Sharaf al-Dīn al-Tūsī (1135–1213), wrote the Al-Muʿādalāt (Treatise on Equations), which dealt with eight types of cubic equations with positive solutions and five types of cubic equations which may not have positive solutions. He used what would later be known as the Horner–Ruffini method to numerically approximate the root of a cubic equation. He also used the concepts of maxima and minima of curves in order to solve cubic equations which may not have positive solutions. He understood the importance of the discriminant of the cubic equation to find algebraic solutions to certain types of cubic equations.

In his book Flos, Leonardo de Pisa, also known as Fibonacci (1170–1250), was able to closely approximate the positive solution to the cubic equation x^{3} + 2x^{2} + 10x = 20. Writing in a sexagesimal numeral system he gave the result as 1,22,7,42,33,4,40 (equivalent to 1 + 22/60 + 7/60^{2} + 42/60^{3} + 33/60^{4} + 4/60^{5} + 40/60^{6}), which has a relative error of about 10^{−9}.

In the early 16th century, the Italian mathematician Scipione del Ferro (1465–1526) found a method for solving a class of cubic equations, namely those of the form x^{3} + mx = n. In fact, all cubic equations can be reduced to this form if one allows m and n to be negative, but negative numbers were not known to him at that time. Del Ferro kept his achievement secret until just before his death, when he told his student Antonio Fior about it.

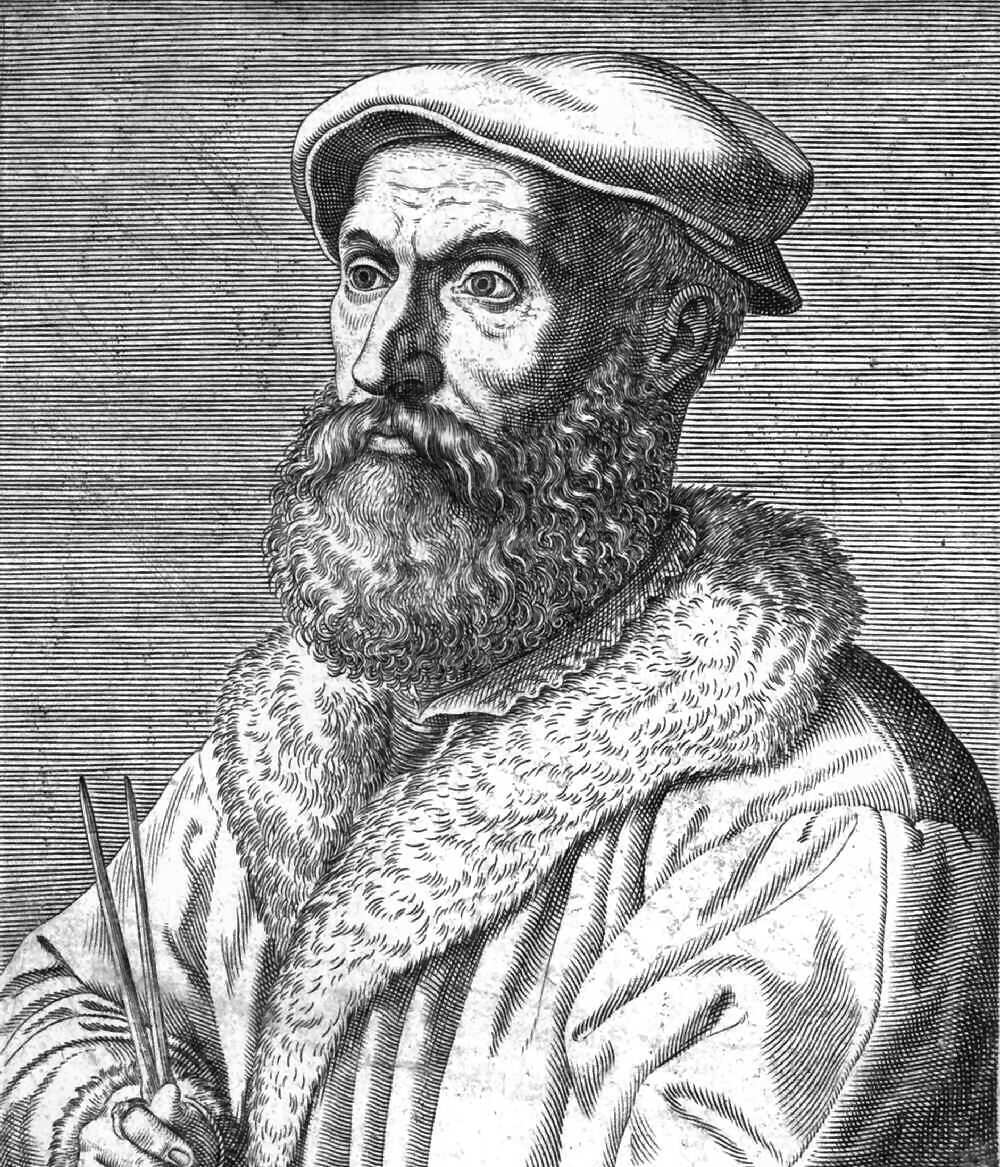
Niccolò Fontana Tartaglia

In 1535, Niccolò Tartaglia (1500–1557) received two problems in cubic equations from Zuanne da Coi and announced that he could solve them. He was soon challenged by Fior, which led to a famous contest between the two. Each contestant had to put up a certain amount of money and to propose a number of problems for his rival to solve. Whoever solved more problems within 30 days would get all the money. Tartaglia received questions in the form x^{3} + mx = n, for which he had worked out a general method. Fior received questions in the form x^{3} + mx^{2} = n, which proved to be too difficult for him to solve, and Tartaglia won the contest.

Later, Tartaglia was persuaded by Gerolamo Cardano (1501–1576) to reveal his secret for solving cubic equations. In 1539, Tartaglia did so only on the condition that Cardano would never reveal it and that if he did write a book about cubics, he would give Tartaglia time to publish. Some years later, Cardano learned about del Ferro's prior work and published del Ferro's method in his book Ars Magna in 1545, meaning Cardano gave Tartaglia six years to publish his results (with credit given to Tartaglia for an independent solution).

Cardano's promise to Tartaglia said that he would not publish Tartaglia's work, and Cardano felt he was publishing del Ferro's, so as to get around the promise. Nevertheless, this led to a challenge to Cardano from Tartaglia, which Cardano denied. The challenge was eventually accepted by Cardano's student Lodovico Ferrari (1522–1565). Ferrari did better than Tartaglia in the competition, and Tartaglia lost both his prestige and his income.

Cardano noticed that Tartaglia's method sometimes required him to extract the square root of a negative number. He even included a calculation with these complex numbers in Ars Magna, but he did not really understand it. Rafael Bombelli studied this issue in detail and is therefore often considered as the discoverer of complex numbers.

François Viète (1540–1603) independently derived the trigonometric solution for the cubic with three real roots, and René Descartes (1596–1650) extended the work of Viète.

== Factorization ==
If the coefficients of a cubic equation are rational numbers, one can obtain an equivalent equation with integer coefficients, by multiplying all coefficients by a common multiple of their denominators. Such an equation
$$ax^3+bx^2+cx+d=0,$$
with integer coefficients, is said to be reducible if the polynomial on the left-hand side is the product of polynomials of lower degrees. By Gauss's lemma, if the equation is reducible, one can suppose that the factors have integer coefficients.

Finding the roots of a reducible cubic equation is easier than solving the general case. In fact, if the equation is reducible, one of the factors must have degree one, and thus have the form
$$qx-p,$$
with q and p being coprime integers. The rational root test allows finding q and p by examining a finite number of cases (because q must be a divisor of a, and p must be a divisor of d).

Thus, one root is $\textstyle x_1= \frac pq,$ and the other roots are the roots of the other factor, which can be found by polynomial long division. This other factor is
$$\frac aq\,x^2+ \frac{bq+ap}{q^2}\,x+\frac{cq^2+bpq+ap^2}{q^3}.$$
(The coefficients seem not to be integers, but must be integers if $p/q$ is a root.)

Then, the other roots are the roots of this quadratic polynomial and can be found by using the quadratic formula.

== Depressed cubic ==
Cubics of the form
$$t^3+pt+q$$
are said to be depressed. They are much simpler than general cubics, but are fundamental, because by a Tschirnhaus transformation, the study of any cubic may be reduced by a simple change of variable to that of a depressed cubic:

Let
$$ax^3 + bx^2 + cx + d = 0$$
be a cubic equation. The change of variable
$$x=t-\frac b{3a}$$
gives a cubic (in t) that has no term in t^{2}. In fact, $x=-\frac{b}{3a}$ is the inflection point of the original cubic (where the curvature changes sign), so the transformation simply centers the cubic around the inflection point.

After dividing by a one gets the depressed cubic equation
$$t^3+pt+q=0,$$
with
$$\begin{align}
t={}&x+\frac b{3a}\\
p={}&\frac{3ac-b^2}{3a^2} \\
q={}&\frac{2b^3-9abc+27a^2d}{27a^3}.
\end{align}$$

The roots $x_1, x_2, x_3$ of the original equation are related to the roots $t_1,t_2,t_3$ of the depressed equation by the relations
$$x_i = t_i-\frac b{3a},$$
for $i = 1, 2, 3$.

== Discriminant and nature of the roots ==
The nature (real or not, distinct or not) of the roots of a cubic can be determined without computing them explicitly, by using the discriminant.

=== Discriminant ===
The discriminant of a polynomial is a function of its coefficients that is zero if and only if the polynomial has a multiple root, or, if it is divisible by the square of a non-constant polynomial. In other words, the discriminant is nonzero if and only if the polynomial is square-free.

If r_{1}, r_{2}, r_{3} are the three roots (not necessarily distinct nor real) of the cubic $ax^3+bx^2+cx+d,$ then the discriminant is
$$a^4(r_1-r_2)^2(r_1-r_3)^2(r_2-r_3)^2.$$

The discriminant of the depressed cubic $t^3+pt+q$ is
$$-\left(4\,p^3+27\,q^2\right).$$

The discriminant of the general cubic $ax^3+bx^2+cx+d$ is
$$18\,abcd - 4\,b^3d + b^2c^2 - 4\,ac^3 - 27\,a^2d^2.$$
It is the product of $a^4$ and the discriminant of the corresponding depressed cubic. Using the formula relating the general cubic and the associated depressed cubic, this implies that the discriminant of the general cubic can be written as
$$\frac{4(b^2-3ac)^3-(2b^3-9abc +27 a^2d)^2}{27a^2}.$$

It follows that one of these two discriminants is zero if and only if the other is also zero, and, if the coefficients are real, the two discriminants have the same sign. In summary, the same information can be deduced from either one of these two discriminants.

To prove the preceding formulas, one can use Vieta's formulas to express everything as polynomials in r_{1}, r_{2}, r_{3}, and a. The proof then results in the verification of the equality of two polynomials.

=== Nature of the roots ===
If the coefficients of a polynomial are real numbers, and its discriminant $\Delta$ is not zero, there are two cases:

- If $\Delta>0,$ the cubic has three distinct real roots
- If $\Delta<0,$ the cubic has one real root and two non-real complex conjugate roots.

This can be proved as follows. First, if r is a root of a polynomial with real coefficients, then its complex conjugate is also a root. So the non-real roots, if any, occur as pairs of complex conjugate roots. As a cubic polynomial has three roots (not necessarily distinct) by the fundamental theorem of algebra, at least one root must be real.

As stated above, if r_{1}, r_{2}, r_{3} are the three roots of the cubic $ax^3+bx^2+cx+d$, then the discriminant is
$$\Delta=a^4(r_1-r_2)^2(r_1-r_3)^2(r_2-r_3)^2$$

If the three roots are real and distinct, the discriminant is a product of positive reals, that is $\Delta>0.$

If only one root, say r_{1}, is real, then r_{2} and r_{3} are complex conjugates, which implies that r_{2} − r_{3} is a purely imaginary number, and thus that (r_{2} − r_{3})^{2} is real and negative. On the other hand, r_{1} − r_{2} and r_{1} − r_{3} are complex conjugates, and their product is real and positive. Thus the discriminant is the product of a single negative number and several positive ones. That is $\Delta<0.$

=== Multiple root ===
If the discriminant of a cubic is zero, the cubic has a multiple root. If furthermore its coefficients are real, then all of its roots are real.

The discriminant of the depressed cubic $t^3 + p t + q$ is zero if $4p^3 + 27q^2 = 0.$ If p is also zero, then p = q = 0 , and 0 is a triple root of the cubic. If $4p^3 + 27q^2 = 0,$ and p ≠ 0 , then the cubic has a simple root
$$t_1 = \frac{3q}{p}$$

and a double root
$$t_2 = t_3 = -\frac{3q}{2p}.$$

In other words,
$$t^3 + p t + q = \left(t - \frac{3q}{p}\right)\left(t + \frac{3q}{2p}\right)^2.$$

This result can be proved by expanding the latter product or retrieved by solving the rather simple system of equations resulting from Vieta's formulas.

By using the reduction of a depressed cubic, these results can be extended to the general cubic. This gives: If the discriminant of the cubic $ax^3 + b x^2 + c x + d$ is zero, then

- either, if $b^2 = 3ac,$ the cubic has a triple root
  $$x_1 = x_2 = x_3 = -\frac{b}{3a},$$
  and
  $$ax^3 + bx^2 + cx + d = a\left(x + \frac{b}{3a}\right)^3$$
- or, if $b^2 \ne 3ac,$ the cubic has a double root
  $$x_2 = x_3 = \frac{9ad - bc}{2(b^2 - 3ac)},$$
  and a simple root,
  $$x_1 = \frac{4abc - 9a^2d - b^3}{a(b^2 - 3ac)}.$$
  and thus
  $$a x^3 + b x^2 + c x + d = a(x - x_1)(x - x_2)^2.$$

=== Characteristic 2 and 3 ===
The above results are valid when the coefficients belong to a field of characteristic other than 2 or 3, but must be modified for characteristic 2 or 3, because of the involved divisions by 2 and 3.

The reduction to a depressed cubic works for characteristic 2, but not for characteristic 3. However, in both cases, it is simpler to establish and state the results for the general cubic. The main tool for that is the fact that a multiple root is a common root of the polynomial and its formal derivative. In these characteristics, if the derivative is not a constant, it is a linear polynomial in characteristic 3, and is the square of a linear polynomial in characteristic 2. Therefore, for either characteristic 2 or 3, the derivative has only one root. This allows computing the multiple root, and the third root can be deduced from the sum of the roots, which is provided by Vieta's formulas.

A difference with other characteristics is that, in characteristic 2, the formula for a double root involves a square root, and, in characteristic 3, the formula for a triple root involves a cube root.

== Cardano's formula ==
Gerolamo Cardano is credited with publishing the first formula for solving cubic equations, attributing it to Scipione del Ferro and Niccolo Fontana Tartaglia. The formula applies to depressed cubics, but, as shown in § Depressed cubic, it allows solving all cubic equations.

Cardano's result is that if
$$t^3+pt+q=0$$
is a cubic equation such that p and q are real numbers such that $\frac{q^2}4+\frac{p^3}{27}$ is positive (this implies that the discriminant of the equation is negative) then the equation has the real root $\sqrt[3]{u_1}+\sqrt[3]{u_2},$ where $u_1$ and $u_2$ are the two numbers
$$-\frac q2 + \sqrt{\frac{q^2}4+\frac{p^3}{27}}\qquad\text{and}\quad -\frac q2 - \sqrt{\frac{q^2}4+\frac{p^3}{27}}$$
. See § Derivation of the roots, below, for several methods for getting this result.

As shown in § Nature of the roots, the two other roots are non-real complex conjugate numbers, in this case. It was later shown (Cardano did not know complex numbers) that the two other roots are obtained by multiplying one of the cube roots by the primitive cube root of unity $\varepsilon_1=\frac{-1+i\sqrt 3} 2,$ and the other cube root by the other primitive cube root of unity $\varepsilon_2=\varepsilon_1^2=\frac{-1-i\sqrt 3} 2.$ That is, the other roots of the equation are $\varepsilon_1\sqrt[3]{u_1}+\varepsilon_2 \sqrt[3]{u_2}$ and $\varepsilon_2\sqrt[3]{u_1}+\varepsilon_1 \sqrt[3]{u_2}.$

If $4p^3+27q^2 < 0,$ there are three real roots, but Galois theory allows proving that, if there is no rational root, the roots cannot be expressed by an algebraic expression involving only real numbers. Therefore, the equation cannot be solved in this case with the knowledge of Cardano's time. This case has thus been called casus irreducibilis, meaning irreducible case in Latin.

In casus irreducibilis, Cardano's formula can still be used, but some care is needed in the use of cube roots.

A first method that aplies only in casus irreducibilis is to remark that, since the roots are all real, the two cubic roots of Cardano formula must be complex conjugate. So, the three roots are
$$U+\overline U,$$
where $U$ is any of the three cubic roots of
$$-\frac q2 + \sqrt{\frac{q^2}4+\frac{p^3}{27}},$$
and $\overline U$ is the complex conjugate of $U$.

A second method is to define the symbols $\sqrt{{~}^{~}}$ and $\sqrt[3]{{~}^{~}}$ as representing the principal values of the root function (that is the root that has the largest real part). With this convention Cardano's formula for the three roots remains valid, but is not purely algebraic, as the definition of a principal part is not purely algebraic, since it involves inequalities for comparing real parts. Also, the use of principal cube root may give a wrong result if the coefficients are non-real complex numbers. Moreover, if the coefficients belong to another field, the principal cube root is not defined in general.

A third way for making Cardano's formula always correct, is to remark that the product of the two cube roots must be −p / 3. It results that a root of the equation is
$$C-\frac p{3C}\quad\text{with}\quad C=\sqrt[3]{-\frac q2+\sqrt{\frac{q^2}4+\frac{p^3}{27}}}.$$
In this formula, the symbols $\sqrt{{~}^{~}}$ and $\sqrt[3]{{~}^{~}}$ denote any square root and any cube root. The other roots of the equation are obtained either by changing of cube root or, equivalently, by multiplying the cube root by a primitive cube root of unity, that is $\textstyle \frac{-1\pm \sqrt{-3}}2.$

This formula for the roots is always correct except when p = q = 0, with the proviso that if p = 0, the square root is chosen so that C ≠ 0. However, Cardano's formula is useless if $p=0,$ as the roots are the cube roots of $-q.$ Similarly, the formula is also useless in the cases where no cube root is needed, that is when the cubic polynomial is not irreducible; this includes the case $4p^3+27q^2=0.$

This formula is also correct when p and q belong to any field of characteristic other than 2 or 3.

=== Numerical examples ===
==== Three real roots ====
Consider finding all roots of the cubic
$$x^3 - 6x + 4 = 0.$$
This is already in the form of a depressed cubic, with $p=-6$ and $q=4$. Cardano's formula begins by calculating
$$\frac{q^2}4+\frac{p^3}{27} = \frac{16}{4} - \frac{216}{27} = -4.$$
Since this is negative, the cubic has three distinct real roots, given by
$$r+\overline r,$$
where $r$ is any of the three cubic roots of $-2-2i$ and $\overline r$ is its complex conjugate.

As
$$(1 + i)^{3} = -2 + 2i,$$
one of the roots of the given cubic equation is
$$x_1= 1+i +\overline{1+i}=2.$$

The two other cubic roots of $-2-2i$ are
$$(1+i)\,\frac{-1\pm i\sqrt 3}{2}=\frac{-1\mp\sqrt 3} 2 +i\frac{-1\pm \sqrt 3}{2}$$

So, the two other roots of the cubic equation are
$$\begin{aligned}
x_{2} &= -1 + \sqrt{3} \\
x_{3} &= -1 - \sqrt{3}.
\end{aligned}$$

==== One real root ====
Consider finding all roots of the cubic
$$x^3 - 9x^2 + 64x - 350 = 0.$$
To obtain the depressed cubic, the substitution $x=t+3$ gives
$$t^3 +37t -212 = 0$$
which has $p=37$ and $q=-212$. Cardano's formula begins by calculating
$$\frac{q^2}4+ \frac{p^3}{27} = 11236 + \frac{50653}{27} = \frac{354025}{27}.$$
Since this is positive, the cubic has one real root and two complex conjugate roots. The real root is given by
$$t = \sqrt[3]{106 + \frac{595 \sqrt{3}}{9}} + \sqrt[3]{106 - \frac{595 \sqrt{3}}{9}}.$$
The two cube roots can be simplified by observing that
$$\left( 2 + \frac{7 \sqrt{3}}{3} \right)^3 = 106 + \frac{595\sqrt{3}}{9}$$
and
$$\left( 2 - \frac{7 \sqrt{3}}{3} \right)^3 = 106 - \frac{595\sqrt{3}}{9}.$$
Therefore,
$$t = 2 + \frac{7 \sqrt{3}}{3} + 2 - \frac{7 \sqrt{3}}{3} = 4,$$
and since $x=t+3$, the real solution of the original cubic is
$$x_{1}=7.$$
Factoring the original cubic gives
$$x^3 - 9x^2 + 64x - 350 = (x-7)(x^2 - 2x + 50).$$
The remaining two roots can be computed using the quadratic formula, which gives
$$x = \frac{2 \pm \sqrt{4 - 200}}{2} = 1 \pm 7i.$$
So, the two other roots of the cubic equation are
$$\begin{aligned}
x_{2} &= 1 + 7i \\
x_{3} &= 1 - 7i.
\end{aligned}$$

== General cubic formula ==
A cubic formula for the roots of the general cubic equation (with a ≠ 0)
$$ax^3+bx^2+cx+d=0$$
can be deduced from every variant of Cardano's formula by reduction to a depressed cubic. The variant that is presented here is valid not only for complex coefficients, but also for coefficients a, b, c, d belonging to any algebraically closed field of characteristic other than 2 or 3. If the coefficients are real numbers, the formula covers all complex solutions, not just real ones.

The formula is rather complicated, so it is worth splitting it into smaller formulas.

Let
$$\begin{align}
\Delta_0 &= b^2 - 3ac,\\
\Delta_1 &= 2b^3 - 9abc + 27a^2d.
\end{align}$$

(Both $\Delta_0$ and $\Delta_1$ can be expressed as resultants of the cubic and its derivatives: $\Delta_1$ is (−1)/8a times the resultant of the cubic and its second derivative, and $\Delta_0$ is (−1)/12a times the resultant of the first and second derivatives of the cubic polynomial.)

Then let
$$C = \sqrt[3]{\frac{\Delta_1 \pm \sqrt{\Delta_1^2 - 4 \Delta_0^3}}2},$$
where the symbols $\sqrt{{~}^{~}}$ and $\sqrt[3]{{~}^{~}}$ are interpreted as any square root and any cube root, respectively (every nonzero complex number has two square roots and three cubic roots). The sign "±" before the square root is either "+" or "–"; the choice is almost arbitrary, and changing it amounts to choosing a different square root. However, if a choice yields C = 0 (this occurs if $\Delta_0=0$), then the other sign must be selected instead. If both choices yield C = 0, that is, if $\Delta_0=\Delta_1=0,$ a fraction 0/0 occurs in following formulas; this fraction must be interpreted as equal to zero (see the end of this section). With these conventions, one of the roots is
$$x = - \frac{1}{3a}\left(b+C+\frac{\Delta_0}{C}\right).$$

The other two roots can be obtained by changing the choice of the cube root in the definition of C, or, equivalently by multiplying C by a primitive cube root of unity, that is (–1 ± √–3)/2. In other words, the three roots are
$$x_k = - \frac{1}{3a}\left(b+\xi^kC+\frac{\Delta_0}{\xi^kC}\right), \qquad k \in \{0,1,2\} \text{,}$$
where ξ = (–1 + √–3)/2.

As for the special case of a depressed cubic, this formula applies but is useless when the roots can be expressed without cube roots. In particular, if $\Delta_0=\Delta_1=0,$ the formula gives that the three roots equal $\frac {-b}{3a},$ which means that the cubic polynomial can be factored as $\textstyle a(x+\frac b{3a})^3.$ A straightforward computation allows verifying that the existence of this factorization is equivalent with $\Delta_0=\Delta_1=0.$

== Trigonometric and hyperbolic solutions ==
=== Trigonometric solution for three real roots ===
When a cubic equation with real coefficients has three real roots, the formulas expressing these roots in terms of radicals involve complex numbers. Galois theory allows proving that when the three roots are real, and none is rational (casus irreducibilis), one cannot express the roots in terms of real radicals. Nevertheless, purely real expressions of the solutions may be obtained using trigonometric functions, specifically in terms of cosines and arccosines. More precisely, the roots of the depressed cubic
$$t^3 + pt + q = 0$$
are
$$t_k = 2\,\sqrt{-\frac{p}{3}}\,\cos\left[\,\frac{1}{3} \arccos\left(\frac{3q}{2p}\sqrt{\frac{-3}{p}}\,\right) - \frac{2\pi k}{3}\,\right] \qquad \text{for } k=0,1,2.$$

This formula is due to François Viète. It is purely real when the equation has three real roots (that is $4p^3 + 27q^2 < 0$). Otherwise, it is still correct but involves complex cosines and arccosines when there is only one real root, and it is nonsensical (division by zero) when p = 0.

This formula can be straightforwardly transformed into a formula for the roots of a general cubic equation, using the back-substitution described in § Depressed cubic.

The formula can be proved as follows: Starting from the equation t^{3} + pt + q = 0, let us set t = u cos θ. The idea is to choose u to make the equation coincide with the identity
$$4\cos^3\theta - 3\cos\theta - \cos(3\theta) = 0.$$
For this, divide the equation by $\frac{u^3}{4}$ and choose $u = 2\,\sqrt{-\frac{p}{3}}$. This gives
$$4\cos^3\theta - 3\cos\theta - \frac{3q}{2p}\,\sqrt{ \frac{-3}{p} } = 0.$$
Combining with the above identity, one gets
$$\cos(3\theta) = \frac{3q}{2p}\sqrt{\frac{-3}{p}}\,,$$
and the roots are thus
$$t_k = 2\,\sqrt{-\frac{p}{3}}\,\cos\left[ \frac{1}{3} \arccos\left( \frac{3q}{2p}\sqrt{\frac{-3}{p}} \right) - \frac{2\pi k}{3} \right] \qquad \text{for } k=0,1,2.$$

=== Hyperbolic solution for one real root ===
When there is only one real root (and p ≠ 0), this root can be similarly represented using hyperbolic functions, as
$$\begin{align} t_0 &= -2\frac{|q|}{q}\sqrt{-\frac{p}{3}}\cosh\left[\frac{1}{3}\operatorname{arcosh}\left(\frac{-3|q|}{2p}\sqrt{\frac{-3}{p}}\right)\right] \qquad \text{if } ~ 4 p^3 + 27 q^2 > 0 ~\text{ and }~ p < 0,\\
t_0 & = -2\sqrt{\frac{p}{3}}\sinh\left[\frac{1}{3}\operatorname{arsinh}\left(\frac{3q}{2p}\sqrt{\frac{3}{p}}\right)\right] \qquad \text{if } ~ p > 0.\end{align}$$
If p ≠ 0 and the inequalities on the right are not satisfied (the case of three real roots), the formulas remain valid but involve complex quantities.

When p = ±3, the above values of t_{0} are sometimes called the Chebyshev cube root. More precisely, the values involving cosines and hyperbolic cosines define, when p = −3, the same analytic function denoted C_{1/3}(q), which is the proper Chebyshev cube root. The value involving hyperbolic sines is similarly denoted S_{1/3}(q), when p = 3.

== Geometric solutions ==
=== Omar Khayyám's solution ===
Omar Khayyám's geometric solution of a cubic equation, for the case m = 2, n = 16, giving the root 2. The intersection of the vertical line on the x-axis at the center of the circle is happenstance of the example illustrated.

For solving the cubic equation x^{3} + m^{2}x = n where n > 0, Omar Khayyám constructed the parabola y = x^{2}/m, the circle that has as a diameter the line segment [0, n/m^{2}] on the positive x-axis, and a vertical line through the point where the circle and the parabola intersect above the x-axis. The solution is given by the length of the horizontal line segment from the origin to the intersection of the vertical line and the x-axis (see the figure).

A simple modern proof is as follows. Multiplying the equation by x/m^{2} and regrouping the terms gives
$$\frac{x^4}{m^2}= x\left(\frac{n}{m^2}-x\right).$$
The left-hand side is the value of y^{2} on the parabola. The equation of the circle being y^{2} + x(x − n/m^{2}) = 0, the right hand side is the value of y^{2} on the circle.

=== Solution with angle trisector ===
A cubic equation with real coefficients can be solved geometrically using compass, straightedge, and an angle trisector if and only if it has three real roots.

A cubic equation can be solved by compass-and-straightedge construction (without trisector) if and only if it has a rational root. This implies that the old problems of angle trisection and doubling the cube, set by ancient Greek mathematicians, cannot be solved by compass-and-straightedge construction.

== Geometric interpretation of the roots ==
=== Three real roots ===
For the cubic (1) with three real roots, the roots are the projection on the x-axis of the vertices A, B, and C of an equilateral triangle. The center of the triangle has the same x-coordinate as the inflection point.

Viète's trigonometric expression of the roots in the three-real-roots case lends itself to a geometric interpretation in terms of a circle. When the cubic is written in depressed form (2), t^{3} + pt + q = 0, as shown above, the solution can be expressed as

$$t_k=2\sqrt{-\frac{p}{3}}\cos\left(\frac{1}{3}\arccos\left(\frac{3q}{2p}\sqrt{\frac{-3}{p}}\right)-k\frac{2\pi}{3}\right) \quad \text{for} \quad k=0,1,2 \,.$$

Here $\arccos\left(\frac{3q}{2p}\sqrt{\frac{-3}{p}}\right)$ is an angle in the unit circle; taking 1/3 of that angle corresponds to taking a cube root of a complex number; adding −k2π/3 for k = 1, 2 finds the other cube roots; and multiplying the cosines of these resulting angles by $2\sqrt{-\frac{p}{3}}$ corrects for scale.

For the non-depressed case (1) (shown in the accompanying graph), the depressed case as indicated previously is obtained by defining t such that x = t − b/3a so t = x + b/3a. Graphically this corresponds to simply shifting the graph horizontally when changing between the variables t and x, without changing the angle relationships. This shift moves the point of inflection and the centre of the circle onto the y-axis. Consequently, the roots of the equation in t sum to zero.

=== One real root ===
==== In the Cartesian plane ====
The slope of line RA is twice that of RH. Denoting the complex roots of the cubic as g ± hi, g = O̅M̅ (negative here) and h = √tan ORH = √slope of line RH = B̅E̅ = D̅A̅.

When the graph of a cubic function is plotted in the Cartesian plane, if there is only one real root, it is the abscissa (x-coordinate) of the horizontal intercept of the curve (point R on the figure). Further, if the complex conjugate roots are written as g ± hi, then the real part g is the abscissa of the tangency point H of the tangent line to cubic that passes through x-intercept R of the cubic (that is the signed length OM, negative on the figure). The imaginary parts ±h are the square roots of the tangent of the angle between this tangent line and the horizontal axis.

==== In the complex plane ====
With one real and two complex roots, the three roots can be represented as points in the complex plane, as can the two roots of the cubic's derivative. There is an interesting geometrical relationship among all these roots.

The points in the complex plane representing the three roots serve as the vertices of an isosceles triangle. (The triangle is isosceles because one root is on the horizontal (real) axis and the other two roots, being complex conjugates, appear symmetrically above and below the real axis.) Marden's theorem says that the points representing the roots of the derivative of the cubic are the foci of the Steiner inellipse of the triangle—the unique ellipse that is tangent to the triangle at the midpoints of its sides. If the angle at the vertex on the real axis is less than π/3 then the major axis of the ellipse lies on the real axis, as do its foci and hence the roots of the derivative. If that angle is greater than π/3, the major axis is vertical and its foci, the roots of the derivative, are complex conjugates. And if that angle is π/3, the triangle is equilateral, the Steiner inellipse is simply the triangle's incircle, its foci coincide with each other at the incenter, which lies on the real axis, and hence the derivative has duplicate real roots.

== Galois group ==
Given a cubic irreducible polynomial over a field K of characteristic different from 2 and 3, the Galois group over K is the group of the field automorphisms that fix K of the smallest extension of K (splitting field). As these automorphisms must permute the roots of the polynomials, this group is either the group S_{3} of all six permutations of the three roots, or the group A_{3} of the three circular permutations.

The discriminant Δ of the cubic is the square of
$$\sqrt \Delta =a^2(r_1-r_2)(r_1-r_3)(r_2-r_3),$$
where a is the leading coefficient of the cubic, and r_{1}, r_{2} and r_{3} are the three roots of the cubic. As $\sqrt \Delta$ changes sign if two roots are exchanged, $\sqrt \Delta$ is fixed by the Galois group only if the Galois group is A_{3}. In other words, the Galois group is A_{3} if and only if the discriminant is the square of an element of K.

As most integers are not squares, when working over the field Q of the rational numbers, the Galois group of most irreducible cubic polynomials is the group S_{3} with six elements. An example of a Galois group A_{3} with three elements is given by p(x) = x^{3} − 3x − 1, whose discriminant is 81 = 9^{2}.

== Derivation of the roots ==
This section regroups several methods for deriving Cardano's formula.

=== Cardano's method ===
This method is due to Scipione del Ferro and Tartaglia, but is named after Gerolamo Cardano who first published it in his book Ars Magna (1545).

This method applies to a depressed cubic t^{3} + pt + q = 0. The idea is to introduce two variables u and $v$ such that $u+v=t$ and to substitute this in the depressed cubic, giving
$$u^3 + v^3 + (3uv + p)(u+v)+ q= 0.$$

At this point Cardano imposed the condition $3uv+p=0.$ This removes the third term in the previous equality, leading to the system of equations
$$\begin{align}u^3 + v^3&=-q \\ uv&=-\frac p3.\end{align}$$
As the second equation implies $u^3 v^3 = -p^3/27,$ we have the sum and the product of u^{3} and $v^3,$ which are therefore the two solutions of the quadratic equation (see Vieta's formulas)

$$x^2 + qx -\frac {p^3}{27}=0.$$
The discriminant of this equation is $\Delta = q^2 + \frac{4p^3}{27}$, and assuming it is positive, real solutions to this equation are (after folding division by 4 under the square root):
$$-\frac q2 \pm \sqrt {\frac {q^2}{4} +\frac {p^3}{27}}.$$
So (without loss of generality in choosing u or $v$):
$$u = \sqrt[3]{-\frac q2 + \sqrt {\frac {q^2}{4} +\frac {p^3}{27}}}.$$
$$v = \sqrt[3]{-\frac q2 - \sqrt {\frac {q^2}{4} +\frac {p^3}{27}}}.$$
As $u+v=t,$ the sum of the cube roots of these solutions is a root of the equation. That is
$$t=\sqrt[3]{-{q\over 2}+\sqrt{{q^{2}\over 4}+{p^{3}\over 27}}} +\sqrt[3]{-{q\over 2}-\sqrt{{q^{2}\over 4}+{p^{3}\over 27}}}$$
is a root of the equation; this is Cardano's formula.

This works well when $4p^3+27q^2 > 0,$ but, if $4p^3+27q^2 < 0,$ the square root appearing in the formula is not real. As a complex number has three cube roots, using Cardano's formula without care would provide nine roots, while a cubic equation cannot have more than three roots. This was clarified first by Rafael Bombelli in his book L'Algebra (1572). The solution is to use the fact that $uv=-\frac p3,$ that is, $v=\frac{-p}{3u}.$ This means that only one cube root needs to be computed, and leads to the second formula given in § Cardano's formula.

The other roots of the equation can be obtained by changing of cube root, or, equivalently, by multiplying the cube root by each of the two primitive cube roots of unity, which are $\frac {-1\pm \sqrt{-3}}2.$

When only one root is real, u and v will be the complex conjugates of one another, implying that the one real root must be $t=2\mathrm{Re}(u)$.

=== Vieta's substitution ===
Vieta's substitution is a method introduced by François Viète (Vieta is his Latin name) in a text published posthumously in 1615, which provides directly the second formula of § Cardano's method, and avoids the problem of computing two different cube roots.

Vieta's substitution takes t = w − p/3w. (Note: More precisely, Vieta introduced a new variable w and imposed the condition w(t + w) = p/3. This is equivalent with the substitution t = p/3w − w, and differs from the substitution that is used here only by a change of sign of w. This change of sign allows direct inference of § Cardano's formula. Vieta's substitution is closely related to the Joukowsky transform and the cosine function.). After substitution into the depressed cubic t^{3} + pt + q = 0, one finds
$$w^3+q-\frac{p^3}{27w^3}=0.$$
or the equivalent
$$(w^3)^2+q(w^3)-\frac{p^3}{27}=0.$$
Since this is a 6th degree polynomial in $w$, the Fundamental Theorem of Algebra implies it has 6 complex solutions. But it is also a quadratic equation in $w^3$, and all six solutions can be calculated as cube roots of the quadratic equation as
$$W=\sqrt[3]{-\frac q 2\pm\sqrt{\frac{p^3}{27} + \frac {q^2} 4}}.$$
In Vieta's substitution, for each value of $t$ there are two possible values for $w$, so each root of the cubic equation is found twice. If w_{1}, w_{2} and w_{3} are the three values of W take using the positive square root, then the roots of the original depressed cubic are w_{1} − p/3w_{1}, w_{2} − p/3w_{2}, and w_{3} − p/3w_{3}. The other root of the quadratic equation is $\textstyle -\frac {p^3}{27W^3}.$ This implies that changing the sign of the square root exchanges w_{i} and − p/3w_{i} for i = 1, 2, 3, and therefore does not change the roots. This method only fails when both roots of the quadratic equation are zero, that is when p = q = 0, in which case the only root of the depressed cubic is 0.

=== Lagrange's method ===
In his paper Réflexions sur la résolution algébrique des équations ("Thoughts on the algebraic solving of equations"), Joseph Louis Lagrange introduced a new method to solve equations of low degree in a uniform way, with the hope that he could generalize it for higher degrees. This method works well for cubic and quartic equations, but Lagrange did not succeed in applying it to a quintic equation, because it requires solving a resolvent polynomial of degree at least six. Apart from the fact that nobody had previously succeeded, this was the first indication of the non-existence of an algebraic formula for degrees 5 and higher; as was later proved by the Abel–Ruffini theorem. Nevertheless, modern methods for solving solvable quintic equations are mainly based on Lagrange's method.

In the case of cubic equations, Lagrange's method gives the same solution as Cardano's. Lagrange's method can be applied directly to the general cubic equation ax^{3} + bx^{2} + cx + d = 0, but the computation is simpler with the depressed cubic equation, t^{3} + pt + q = 0.

Lagrange's main idea was to work with the discrete Fourier transform of the roots instead of with the roots themselves. More precisely, let ξ be a primitive third root of unity, that is a number such that ξ^{3} = 1 and ξ^{2} + ξ + 1 = 0 (when working in the space of complex numbers, one has $\textstyle \xi=\frac{-1\pm i\sqrt 3}2=e^{2i\pi/3},$ but this complex interpretation is not used here). Denoting x_{0}, x_{1} and x_{2} the three roots of the cubic equation to be solved, let
$$\begin{align}
s_0 &= x_0 + x_1 + x_2,\\
s_1 &= x_0 + \xi x_1 + \xi^2 x_2,\\
s_2 &= x_0 + \xi^2 x_1 + \xi x_2,
\end{align}$$
be the discrete Fourier transform of the roots. If s_{0}, s_{1} and s_{2} are known, the roots may be recovered from them with the inverse Fourier transform consisting of inverting this linear transformation; that is,
$$\begin{align}
x_0 &= \tfrac13(s_0 + s_1 + s_2),\\
x_1 &= \tfrac13(s_0 + \xi^2 s_1 + \xi s_2),\\
x_2 &= \tfrac13(s_0 + \xi s_1 + \xi ^2 s_2).
\end{align}$$

By Vieta's formulas, s_{0} is known to be zero in the case of a depressed cubic, and −b/a for the general cubic. So, only s_{1} and s_{2} need to be computed. They are not symmetric functions of the roots (exchanging x_{1} and x_{2} exchanges also s_{1} and s_{2}), but some simple symmetric functions of s_{1} and s_{2} are also symmetric in the roots of the cubic equation to be solved. Thus these symmetric functions can be expressed in terms of the (known) coefficients of the original cubic, and this allows eventually expressing the s_{i} as roots of a polynomial with known coefficients. This works well for every degree, but, in degrees higher than four, the resulting polynomial that has the s_{i} as roots has a degree higher than that of the initial polynomial, and is therefore unhelpful for solving. This is the reason for which Lagrange's method fails in degrees five and higher.

In the case of a cubic equation, $P=s_1s_2,$ and $S=s_1^3+s_2^3$ are such symmetric polynomials (see below). It follows that $s_1^3$ and $s_2^3$ are the two roots of the quadratic equation $z^2-Sz+P^3=0.$ Thus the resolution of the equation may be finished exactly as with Cardano's method, with $s_1$ and $s_2$ in place of u and $v.$

In the case of the depressed cubic, one has $x_0=\tfrac 13 (s_1+s_2)$ and $s_1s_2=-3p,$ while in Cardano's method we have set $x_0=u+v$ and $uv=-\tfrac 13 p.$ Thus, up to the exchange of u and $v,$ we have $s_1=3u$ and $s_2=3v.$ In other words, in this case, Cardano's method and Lagrange's method compute exactly the same things, up to a factor of three in the auxiliary variables, the main difference being that Lagrange's method explains why these auxiliary variables appear in the problem.

==== Computation of S and P ====
A straightforward computation using the relations ξ^{3} = 1 and ξ^{2} + ξ + 1 = 0 gives
$$\begin{align}
P&=s_1s_2=x_0^2+x_1^2+x_2^2-(x_0x_1+x_1x_2+x_2x_0),\\
S&=s_1^3+s_2^3=2(x_0^3+x_1^3+x_2^3)-3(x_0^2x_1+x_1^2x_2+x_2^2x_0+x_0x_1^2+x_1x_2^2+x_2x_0^2)+12x_0x_1x_2.
\end{align}$$

This shows that P and S are symmetric functions of the roots. Using Newton's identities, it is straightforward to express them in terms of the elementary symmetric functions of the roots, giving
$$\begin{align}
P&=e_1^2-3e_2,\\
S&=2e_1^3-9e_1e_2+27e_3,
\end{align}$$
with e_{1} = 0, e_{2} = p and e_{3} = −q in the case of a depressed cubic, and e_{1} = −b/a, e_{2} = c/a and e_{3} = −d/a, in the general case.

== Applications ==
Cubic equations arise in various other contexts.

=== In mathematics ===
- Angle trisection and doubling the cube are two ancient problems of geometry that have been proved to not be solvable by straightedge and compass construction, because they are equivalent to solving a cubic equation.
- Marden's theorem states that the foci of the Steiner inellipse of any triangle can be found by using the cubic function whose roots are the coordinates in the complex plane of the triangle's three vertices. The roots of the first derivative of this cubic are the complex coordinates of those foci.
- The area of a regular heptagon can be expressed in terms of the roots of a cubic. Further, the ratios of the long diagonal to the side, the side to the short diagonal, and the negative of the short diagonal to the long diagonal all satisfy a particular cubic equation. In addition, the ratio of the inradius to the circumradius of a heptagonal triangle is one of the solutions of a cubic equation. The values of trigonometric functions of angles related to $2\pi/7$ satisfy cubic equations.
- Given the cosine (or other trigonometric function) of an arbitrary angle, the cosine of one-third of that angle is one of the roots of a cubic.
- The solution of the general quartic equation relies on the solution of its resolvent cubic.
- The eigenvalues of a 3×3 matrix are the roots of a cubic polynomial which is the characteristic polynomial of the matrix.
- The characteristic equation of a third-order constant coefficients or Cauchy–Euler (equidimensional variable coefficients) linear differential equation or difference equation is a cubic equation.
- Intersection points of cubic Bézier curve and straight line can be computed using direct cubic equation representing Bézier curve.
- Critical points of a quartic function are found by solving a cubic equation (the derivative set equal to zero).
- Inflection points of a quintic function are the solution of a cubic equation (the second derivative set equal to zero).

=== In other sciences ===
- In analytical chemistry, the Charlot equation, which can be used to find the pH of buffer solutions, can be solved using a cubic equation.
- In thermodynamics, equations of state (which relate pressure, volume, and temperature of a substances), e.g. the Van der Waals equation of state, are cubic in the volume.
- Kinematic equations involving linear rates of acceleration are cubic.
- The speed of seismic Rayleigh waves is a solution of the Rayleigh wave cubic equation.
- The steady state speed of a vehicle moving on a slope with air friction for a given input power is solved by a depressed cubic equation.
- Kepler's third law of planetary motion is cubic in the semi-major axis.

== See also ==
- Quartic equation
- Quintic equation
- Tschirnhaus transformation
- Principal equation form
