= Scipione del Ferro =

Italian mathematician (1465–1526)

- Born: 6 February 1465; Bologna
- Died: 5 November 1526 (aged 61); Bologna
- Education: University of Bologna
- Known for: Solving the depressed cubic equation
- Scientific career
- Fields: Mathematics
- Workplaces: University of Bologna

Scipione del Ferro (6 February 1465 – 5 November 1526) was an Italian mathematician who first discovered a method to solve the depressed cubic equation.

== Life ==
Scipione del Ferro was born in Bologna, in northern Italy, to Floriano and Filippa Ferro. His father, Floriano, worked in the paper industry, which owed its existence to the invention of the press in the 1450s and which probably allowed Scipione to access various works during the early stages of his life. He married and had a daughter, who was named Filippa after his mother.

He likely studied at the University of Bologna, where he was appointed a lecturer in Arithmetic and Geometry in 1496. During his last years, he also undertook commercial work.

== Diffusion of his work ==
There are no surviving scripts from del Ferro. This is in large part due to his resistance to communicating his works. Instead of publishing his ideas, he would only show them to a small, select group of friends and students.

It is suspected that this is due to the practice of mathematicians at the time of publicly challenging one another. When a mathematician accepted another's challenge, each mathematician needed to solve the other's problems. The loser in a challenge often lost funding or his university position. Del Ferro was fearful of being challenged and likely kept his greatest work secret so that he could use it to defend himself in the event of a challenge.

Despite this secrecy, he had a notebook where he recorded all his important discoveries. After he died in 1526, his son-in-law Annibale della Nave, who was also a mathematician and married to del Ferro's daughter Filippa, inherited this notebook. Nave was a former student of del Ferro's, and he replaced del Ferro at the University of Bologna after his death.

In 1543, Gerolamo Cardano and Lodovico Ferrari (one of Cardano's students) travelled to Bologna to meet Nave and learn about his late father-in-law's notebook, where the solution to the depressed cubic equation appeared.

== The solution of the cubic equation ==
Mathematicians from del Ferro's time knew that the general cubic equation could be simplified to one of two cases called the depressed cubic equation, for positive numbers $p$ and $q$:

$$x^3 + px = q,$$
$$x^3 = px + q.$$

The term in $x^2$ can always be removed by letting $x=x'+a$ for an appropriate constant $a$.

While it is not known today with certainty what method del Ferro used, it is thought that he used the fact that $x=\sqrt{a+\sqrt{b}}+\sqrt{a-\sqrt{b}}$ solves the equation $x^2=(2\sqrt{a^2-b})x^0+2a$ to conjecture that $x=\sqrt[3]{a+\sqrt{b}}+\sqrt[3]{a-\sqrt{b}}$ solves $x^3=(3\sqrt[3]{a^2-b})x+2a$. This turns out to be true.

Then, with the appropriate substitution of parameters, one can derive a solution to the depressed cubic:

$$\sqrt[3]{\frac{q}{2}+\sqrt{\frac{q^2}{4}+\frac{p^3}{27}}}+\sqrt[3]{\frac{q}{2}-\sqrt{\frac{q^2}{4}+\frac{p^3}{27}}}.$$

There are conjectures about whether del Ferro worked on a solution to the cubic equation as a result of Luca Pacioli's short tenure at the University of Bologna in 1501–1502. Pacioli had previously declared in Summa de arithmetica that he believed a solution to the equation to be impossible, fueling wide interest in the mathematical community.

It is unknown whether Scipione del Ferro solved both cases or not. However, in 1925, manuscripts were discovered by Bortolotti, which contained del Ferro's method and made Bortolotti suspect that del Ferro had solved both cases.

Cardano, in his book Ars Magna (published in 1545), states that it was del Ferro who was the first to solve the cubic equation and that the solution he gives is del Ferro's method.

== Other contributions ==
Del Ferro also made other important contributions to the rationalization of fractions with denominators containing sums of cube roots.

He also investigated geometry problems with a compass set at a fixed angle, but little is known about his work in this area.
