= Bombelli (crater) =

Lunar impact crater

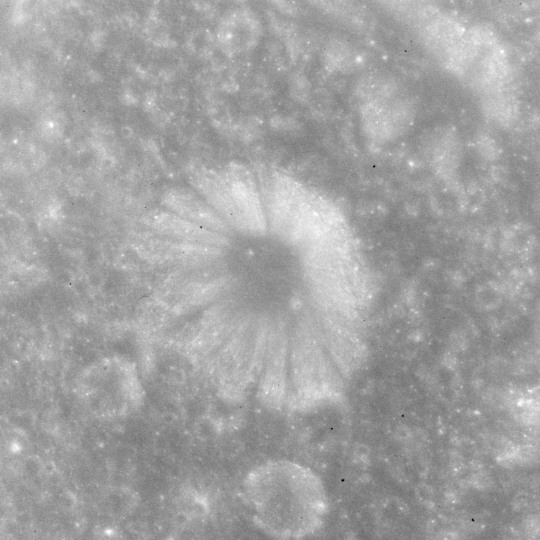
- Apollo 15 image
- Coordinates: 5.28°N 56.19°E
- Diameter: 9.72 km (6.04 mi)
- Depth: 1.6 km
- Colongitude: 304° at sunrise
- Eponym: Raphael Bombelli

Bombelli is a small lunar impact crater that is located in the highlands to the north of the Sinus Successus. The crater Apollonius is located to the east-southeast. Bombelli is a roughly circular crater with a slight outward protrusion to the south-southwest. There is a small interior floor at the midpoint of the sloping interior walls, which is roughly one fourth the diameter of the crater.

Previously identified as Apollonius T, this crater was named after Italian mathematician Raphael Bombelli (1526–1572). Its designation was formally adopted by the International Astronomical Union in 1976.
