= Gerolamo Cardano =

Italian Renaissance polymath (1501–1576)

Girolamo Cardano
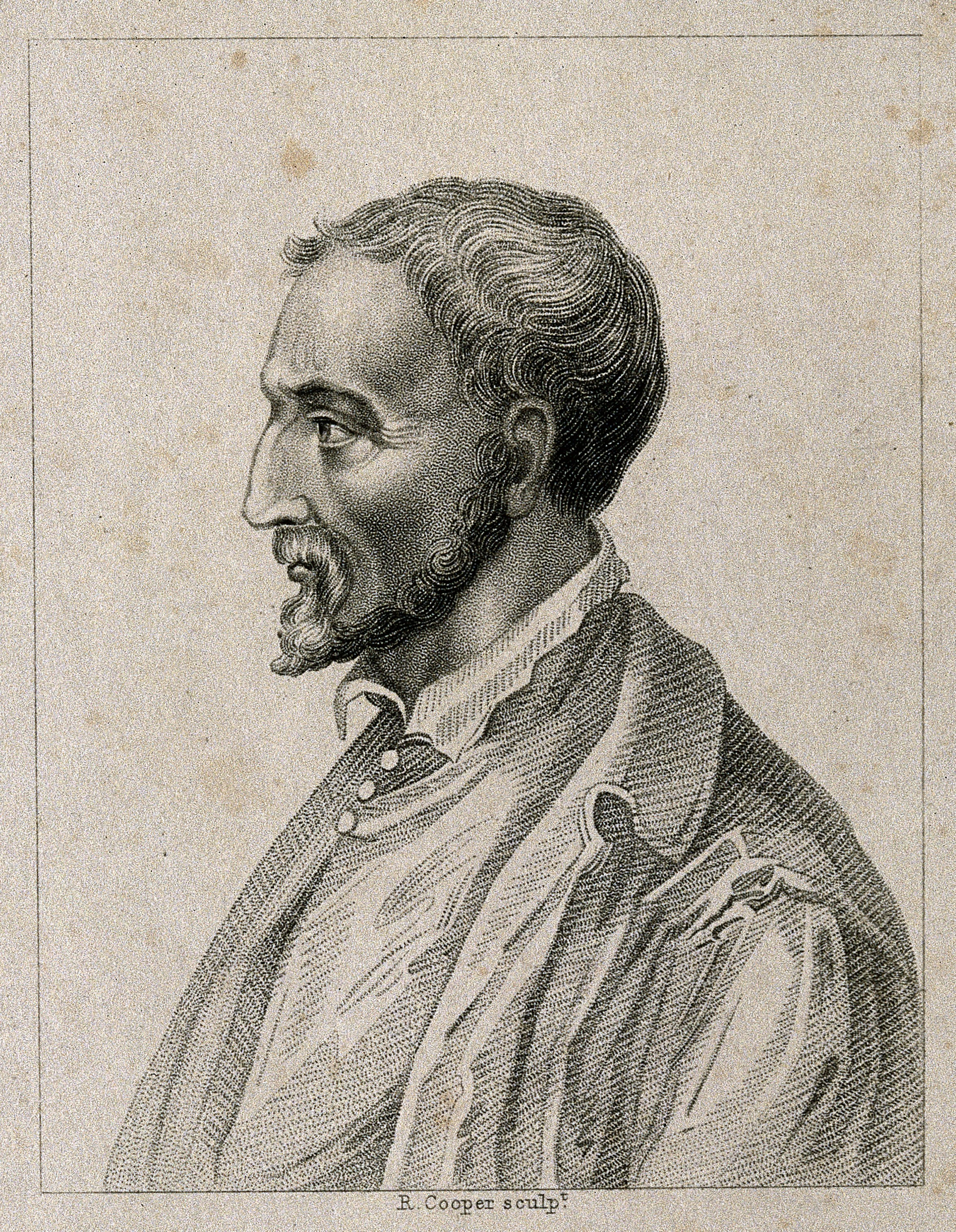
- 17th-century portrait engraving of Cardano
- Born: 24 September 1501; Pavia, Duchy of Milan
- Died: 21 September 1576 (aged 74); Rome, Papal States
- Education: University of Pavia
- Known for: Cardano–Tartaglia formula First systematic use of negative numbers in Europe
- Scientific career
- Fields: Science, mathematics, philosophy, and literature
- Notable students: Lodovico Ferrari

Gerolamo Cardano (Italian: [dʒeˈrɔːlamo karˈdaːno]; also Girolamo or Geronimo; French: Jérôme Cardan; Latin: Hieronymus Cardanus; 24 September 1501– 21 September 1576) was an Italian polymath whose interests and proficiencies ranged through those of mathematician, physician, biologist, physicist, chemist, astrologer, astronomer, philosopher, music theorist, writer, and gambler. He became one of the most influential mathematicians of the Renaissance and one of the key figures in the foundation of probability; he introduced the binomial coefficients and the binomial theorem in the Western world. He wrote more than 200 works on science.

Cardano partially invented and described several mechanical devices including the combination lock, the gimbal consisting of three concentric rings allowing a supported compass or gyroscope to rotate freely, and the Cardan shaft with universal joints, which allows the transmission of rotary motion at various angles and is used in vehicles to this day. He made significant contributions to hypocycloids - published in De proportionibus, in 1570. The generating circles of these hypocycloids, later named "Cardano circles" or "cardanic circles", were used for the construction of the first high-speed printing presses.

Today, Cardano is well known for his achievements in algebra. In his 1545 book Ars Magna he made the first systematic use of negative numbers in Europe, published (with attribution) the solutions of other mathematicians for cubic and quartic equations, and acknowledged the existence of imaginary numbers.

== Early life and education ==
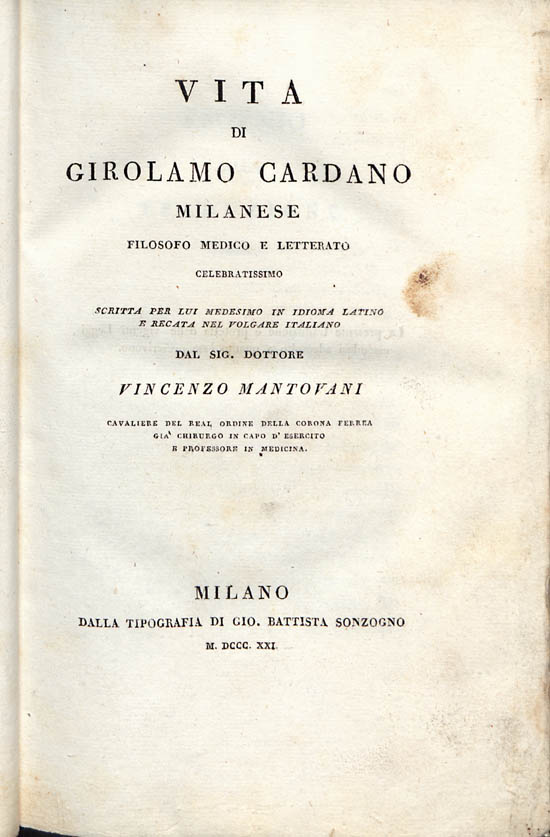
De propria vita, 1821

Cardano was born on 24 September 1501 in Pavia, Lombardy, the illegitimate child of Fazio Cardano, a mathematically gifted jurist, lawyer, and close friend of Leonardo da Vinci. In his autobiography, Cardano wrote that his mother, Chiara Micheri, had taken "various abortive medicines" to terminate the pregnancy; he said: "I was taken by violent means from my mother; I was almost dead." She was in labour for three days. Shortly before his birth, his mother had to move from Milan to Pavia to escape the Plague; her three other children died from the disease.

After a depressing childhood, with frequent illnesses, and the rough upbringing by his overbearing father, in 1520, Cardano entered the University of Pavia. Against the wishes of his father, who wanted his son to undertake studies of law, Girolamo felt more attracted to philosophy and science. During the Italian War of 1521–1526, however, the authorities in Pavia were forced to close the university in 1524. Cardano resumed his studies at the University of Padua, where he graduated with a doctorate in medicine in 1525. His eccentric and confrontational style did not earn him many friends, and he had a difficult time finding work after he completed his studies. In 1525, Cardano repeatedly applied to the College of Physicians in Milan, but was not admitted owing to his combative reputation and illegitimate birth. However, he was consulted by many members of the College of Physicians, because of his irrefutable intelligence.

== Early career as a physician ==
Cardano wanted to practice medicine in a large, rich city like Milan, but he was denied a license to practice, so he settled for the town of Piove di Sacco, where he practised without a licence. There, he married Lucia Banderini in 1531. Before her death in 1546, they had three children, Giovanni Battista (1534), Chiara (1537) and Aldo Urbano (1543). Cardano later wrote that those were the happiest days of his life.

With the help of a few noblemen, Cardano obtained a mathematics teaching position in Milan. Having finally received his medical license, he practised mathematics and medicine simultaneously, treating a few influential patients in the process. Because of this, he became one of the most sought-after doctors in Milan. In fact, by 1536, he was able to quit his teaching position, although he was still interested in mathematics. His notability in the medical field was such that the aristocracy tried to lure him out of Milan. Cardano later wrote that he turned down offers from the kings of Denmark and France and the Queen of Scotland.

Cardano was the rector of the college of medicine of Milan in 1541, when he met the ruler of Milan, Holy Roman Emperor Charles V. He was a vehement supporter of Charles, regarding him as a defender of Europe against the Ottoman Empire and a patron of culture. At the same time, Cardano also praised the emperor's enemies, Francis I of France and Sultan Suleiman the Magnificent, whom he saw as virtuous opponents.

== Mathematics ==
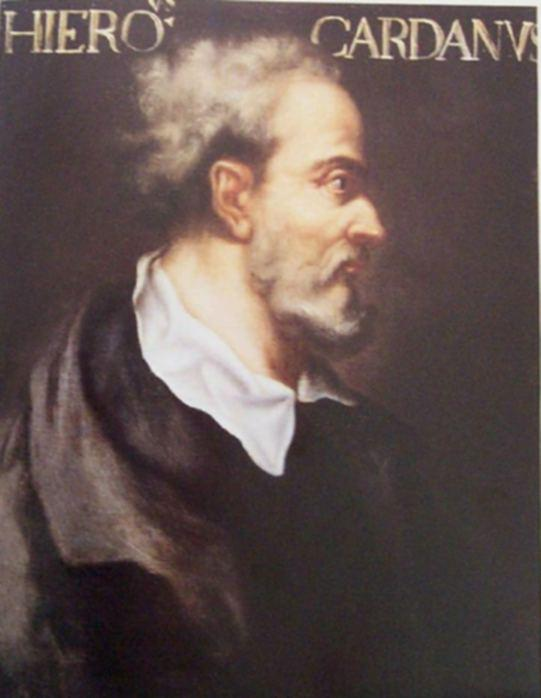
Portrait of Cardano on display at the School of Mathematics and Statistics, University of St Andrews

Gerolamo Cardano was the first European mathematician to make systematic use of negative numbers. He published with attribution the solution of Scipione del Ferro to the cubic equation and the solution of Cardano's student Lodovico Ferrari to the quartic equation in his 1545 book Ars Magna, an influential work on algebra. The solution to one particular case of the cubic equation $ax^3+bx+c=0$ (in modern notation) had been communicated to him in 1539 by Niccolò Fontana Tartaglia (who later claimed that Cardano had sworn not to reveal it, and engaged Cardano in a decade-long dispute) in the form of a poem, but del Ferro's solution predated Tartaglia's. In his exposition, he acknowledged the existence of what are now called imaginary numbers, although he did not understand their properties, described for the first time by his Italian contemporary Rafael Bombelli. In Opus novum de proportionibus, he introduced the binomial coefficients and the binomial theorem.

Cardano was chronically short of money and kept himself solvent by being an accomplished gambler and chess player. His book, Liber de ludo aleae ("Book on Games of Chance"), written around 1564, but not published until 1663, contains the first systematic treatment of probability, as well as a section on effective cheating methods. He used the game of throwing dice to understand the basic concepts of probability. He demonstrated the efficacy of defining odds as the ratio of favourable to unfavourable outcomes (which implies that the probability of an event is given by the ratio of favourable outcomes to the total number of possible outcomes). He was also aware of the multiplication rule for independent events but was not certain about what values should be multiplied.

== Other contributions ==
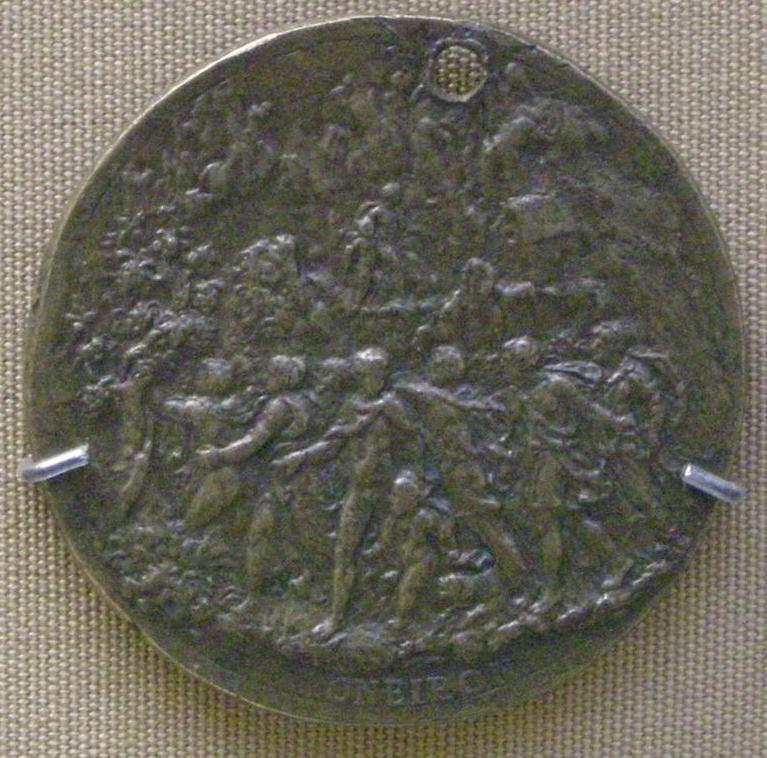
"Oneiron" ("Dream"), reverse of the medallion of Cardano by Leone Leoni, 1550–51

Cardano was a music theorist who studied music privately in Milan in his youth. He wrote two treatises on music, both of which were titled De Musica. The first was published within his 1663 work Hieronymi Cardani Mediolanensis Opera Omnia. It is of interest to scholars on the history of woodwind instruments because of its discussion of instruments from that family. The second treatise was published in 1574, and a copy of it is held in the Vatican Library. The work is valuable for studies in harmony for its discussion of the use of microtones. It is also of interest to scholars of historically informed performance practice for its details on 16th-century performance. The later treatise of music Della natura de principii et regole musicali which has been attributed to Cardano by some, is, according to The New Grove Dictionary of Music and Musicians most likely falsely attributed to Cardano and is by another writer. Cardano also dabbled in composing, writing the motet Beati estis which is scored for 12 voices and contains four overlapping canons.

Cardano's work with hypocycloids led him to Cardan's Movement or Cardan Gear mechanism, in which a pair of gears with the smaller being one-half the size of the larger gear is used to convert rotational motion to linear motion with greater efficiency and precision than a Scotch yoke, for example. He is also credited with the invention of the Cardan suspension or gimbal.

Cardano made several contributions to hydrodynamics and held that perpetual motion is impossible, except in celestial bodies. He published two encyclopedias of natural science, which contain a wide variety of inventions, facts, and occult superstitions. He also introduced the Cardan grille, a cryptographic writing tool, in 1550.

In his mid-16th-century work De Subtilitate, Girolamo Cardano drew attention to the physical properties of steam, specifically the process of condensation as a means of creating a vacuum. In historiography, these observations are interpreted as a milestone in the renewed interest in steam power, following a long period of stagnation in research in this field. This intellectual shift is considered an essential early stage of the process that, over subsequent centuries, led to the development of the steam engine—the primary driver of the Industrial Revolution.

Significantly, in the history of education of the deaf, he said that deaf people were capable of using their minds, argued for the importance of teaching them, and was one of the first to state that deaf people could learn to read and write without learning how to speak first. He was familiar with a report by Rudolph Agricola about a deaf-mute who had learned to write.

Cardano's medical writings included a commentary on Mundinus' anatomy and of Galen's medicine, along with the treaties Delle cause, dei segni e dei luoghi delle malattie, Picciola terapeutica, Degli abusi dei medici and Delle orine, libro quattro.

Cardano has been credited with the invention of the so-called Cardano's Rings, also called Chinese Rings, but it is very probable that they predate Cardano. The universal joint, sometimes called Cardan joint, was not described by Cardano.

== De Subtilitate (1550) ==
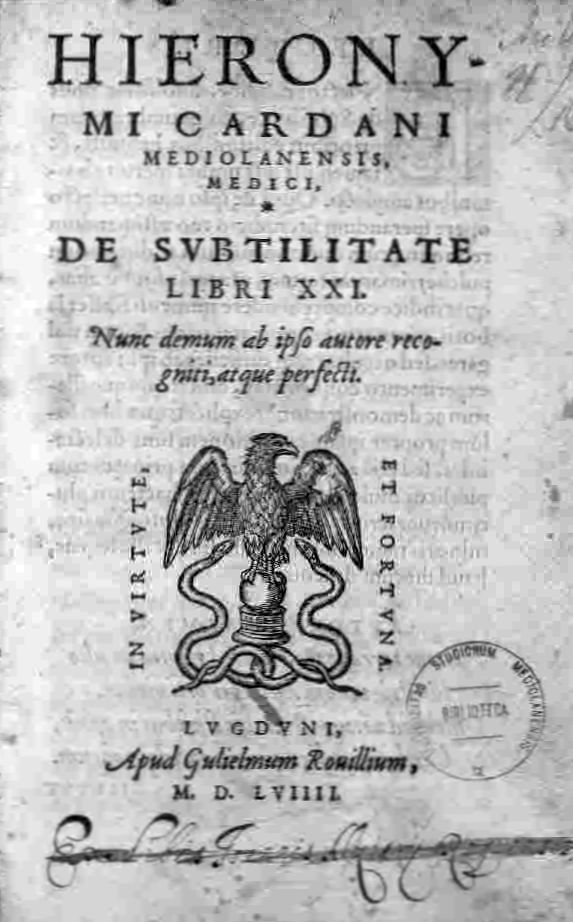
De subtilitate, 1559 edition

As quoted from Charles Lyell's Principles of Geology:

The title of a work of Cardano's, published in 1552, De Subtilitate (corresponding to what would now be called transcendental philosophy), would lead us to expect, in the chapter on minerals, many far fetched theories characteristic of that age; but when treating of petrified shells, he decided that they clearly indicated the former sojourn of the sea upon the mountains.

== Scotland and Archbishop Hamilton ==
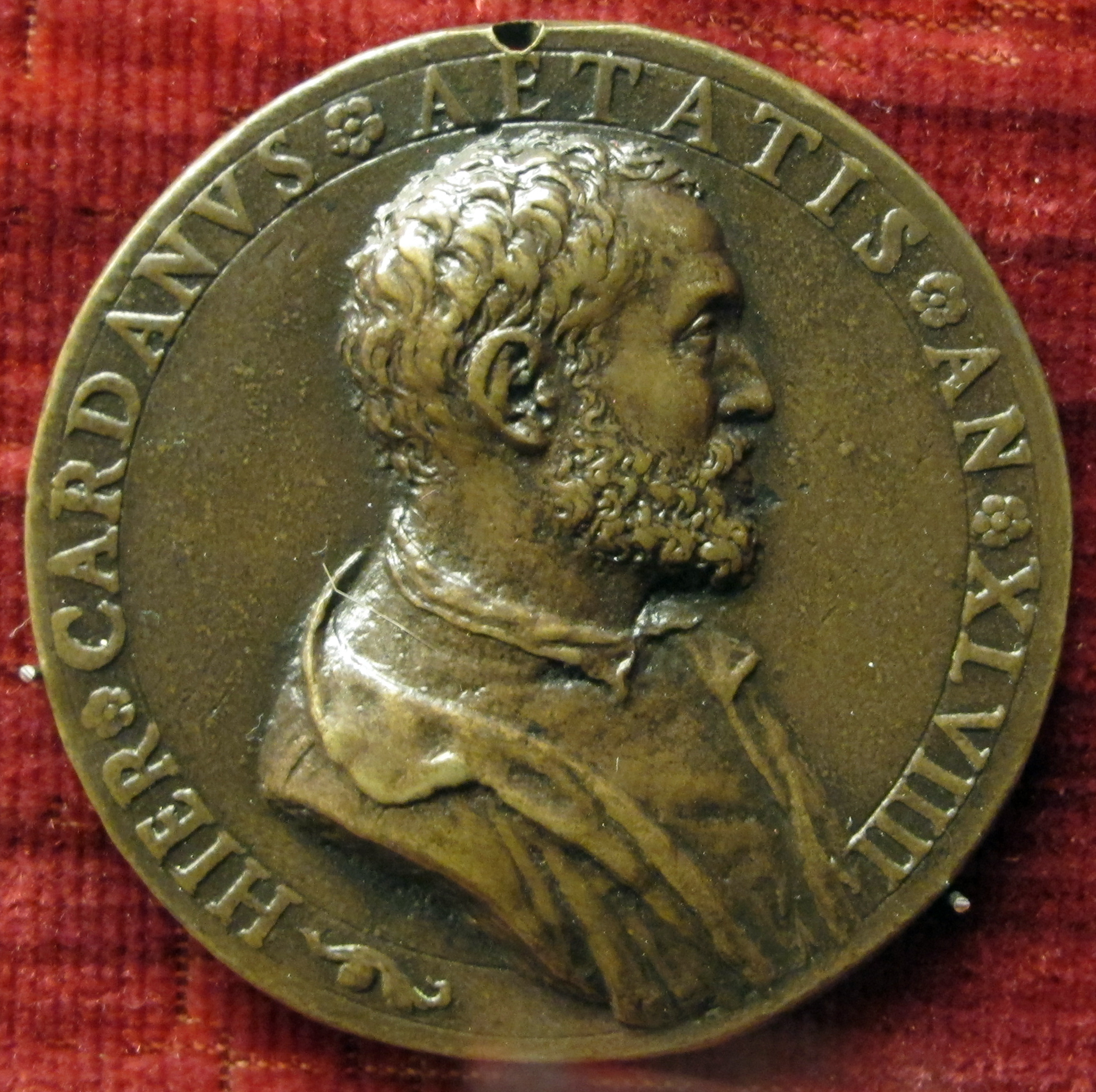
Medallion portrait of Cardano aged 49 by Leone Leoni (1509–1590)

In 1552, Cardano travelled to Scotland with the Spanish physician William Casanatus, via London, to treat the Archbishop of St Andrews who suffered of a disease that had left him speechless and was thought incurable. The treatment was a success, and the diplomat Thomas Randolph recorded that "merry tales" about Cardano's methods were still current in Edinburgh in 1562. Cardano and Casanatus argued over the Archbishop's cure. Cardano wrote that the Archbishop had been short of breath for ten years, and after the cure was effected by his assistant, he was paid 1,400 gold crowns.

== Later years and death ==
Two of Cardano's children — Giovanni Battista and Aldo Urbano — came to ignoble ends. Giovanni Battista, Cardano's eldest and favourite son, was arrested in 1560 for having poisoned his wife, after he had discovered that their three children were not his. Giovanni was put to trial and, when Cardano could not pay the restitution demanded by the victim's family, was sentenced to death and beheaded. Gerolamo's other son Aldo Urbano was a gambler, who stole money from his father, and so Cardano disinherited him in 1569.

Cardano moved from Pavia to Bologna, in part because he believed that the decision to execute his son was influenced by Gerolamo's battles with the academic establishment in Pavia, and his colleagues' jealousy at his scientific achievements, and also because he was beset with allegations of sexual impropriety with his students. He obtained a position as professor of medicine at the University of Bologna.

Cardano was arrested by the Inquisition in 1570 after an accusation of heresy by the Inquisitor of Como, who targeted Cardano's De rerum varietate (1557). The inquisitors complained about Cardano's writings on astrology, especially his claim that self-harming religiously motivated actions of martyrs and heretics were caused by the stars. In his 1543 book De Supplemento Almanach, a commentary on the astrological work Tetrabiblos by Ptolemy, Cardano had also published a horoscope of Jesus. Cardano was imprisoned for several months and lost his professorship in Bologna. He abjured and was freed, probably with help from powerful churchmen in Rome. All his non-medical works were prohibited and placed on the Index.

He moved to Rome, where he received a lifetime annuity from Pope Gregory XIII (after first having been rejected by Pope Pius V, who died in 1572) and finished his autobiography. He was accepted into the Royal College of Physicians, and as well as practising medicine, he continued his philosophical studies until his death in 1576.

The Cardanus crater on the Moon was named after him.

== References in literature and culture ==
The seventeenth-century English physician and philosopher Sir Thomas Browne possessed the ten volumes of the Lyon 1663 edition of the complete works of Cardan in his library.

Browne critically viewed Cardan as:

that famous Physician of Milan, a great Enquirer of Truth, but too greedy a Receiver of it. He hath left many excellent Discourses, Medical, Natural, and Astrological; the most suspicious are those two he wrote by admonition in a dream, that is De Subtilitate & Varietate Rerum. Assuredly this learned man hath taken many things upon trust, and although examined some, hath let slip many others. He is of singular use unto a prudent Reader; but unto him that only desireth Hoties, (Note: plural of “hoti”: Greek ὅτι, “because”) or to replenish his head with varieties; like many others before related, either in the Original or confirmation, he may become no small occasion of Error.

Richard Hinckley Allen tells of an amusing reference made by Samuel Butler in his book Hudibras:

Cardan believ'd great states depend
Upon the tip o'th' Bear's tail's end;
That, as she wisk'd it t'wards the Sun,
Strew'd mighty empires up and down;
Which others say must needs be false,
Because your true bears have no tails.

Alessandro Manzoni's novel The Betrothed (I promessi sposi) portrays a pedantic scholar of the obsolete, Don Ferrante, as a great admirer of Cardano. Significantly, he values him only for his superstitious and astrological writings; his scientific writings are dismissed because they contradict Aristotle, but excused on the ground that the author of the astrological works deserves to be listened to even when he is wrong.

English novelist E. M. Forster's Abinger Harvest, a 1936 volume of essays, authorial reviews and a play, provides a sympathetic treatment of Cardano in the section titled 'The Past'. Forster believes Cardano was so absorbed in "self-analysis that he often forgot to repent of his bad temper, his stupidity, his licentiousness, and love of revenge" (212).

== Works ==
- De malo recentiorum medicorum medendi usu libellus, Hieronymus Scotus, Venice, 1536 (on medicine).
- Practica arithmetice et mensurandi singularis (on mathematics), Io. Antoninus Castellioneus/Bernadino Caluscho, Milan, 1539.
- De Consolatione, Libri tres, Hieronymus Scotus, Venice, 1542.
  - Translation into English by T. Bedingfield (1573).
- Libelli duo: De Supplemento Almanach; De Restitutione temporum et motuum coelestium; Item Geniturae LXVII insignes casibus et fortuna, cum expositione, Iohan. Petreius, Norimbergae, 1543.
- De Sapientia, Libri quinque, Iohan. Petreius, Norimbergae, 1544 (with De Consolatione reprint and De Libris Propriis, book I).
- De Immortalitate animorum, Henric Petreius, Nuremberg 1544/Sebastianus Gryphius, Lyons, 1545.
- Contradicentium medicorum (on medicine), Hieronymus Scotus, Venetijs, 1545.
- Artis magnae, sive de regulis algebraicis (on algebra: also known as Ars magna), Iohan. Petreius, Nuremberg, 1545.
  - Translation into English by D. Witmer (1968).
- Della Natura de Principii e Regole Musicale, ca 1546 (on music theory: in Italian): posthumously published. (most likely falsely attributed to Cardano)
- De Subtilitate rerum (on natural phenomena), Johann Petreius, Nuremberg, 1550.
  - Translation into English by J.M. Forrester (2013).
- Metoposcopia libris tredecim, et octingentis faciei humanae eiconibus complexa (on physiognomy), written 1550 (published posthumously by Thomas Jolly, Paris (Lutetiae Parisiorum), 1658).
- In Cl. Ptolemaei Pelusiensis IIII, De Astrorum judiciis... libros commentaria: cum eiusdem De Genituris libro, Henrichus Petri, Basle, 1554.
- Geniturarum Exemplar (De Genituris liber, separate printing), Theobaldus Paganus, Lyons, 1555.
- Ars Curandi Parva (written c. 1556).
- De Libris propriis (about the books he has written, and his successes in medical work), Gulielmus Rouillius, Leiden, 1557.
- De Rerum varietate, Libri XVII (on natural phenomena); (Revised edition), Matthaeus Vincentius, Avignon 1558. Also Basle, Henricus Petri, 1559.
- Actio prima in calumniatorem (reply to J.C. Scaliger), 1557.
- De Utilitate ex adversis capienda, Libri IIII (on the uses of adversity), Henrich Petri, Basle, 1561.
- Theonoston, seu De Tranquilitate, 1561. (Opera, Vol. II).
- Somniorum synesiorum omnis generis insomnia explicantes, Libri IIII (Book of Dreams: with other writings), Henricus Petri, Basle 1562.
- Neronis encomium (a life of Nero), Basle, 1562.
  - Translation into English by A. Paratico (2012).
- De Providentia ex anni constitutione, Alexander Benaccius, Bononiae, 1563.
- De Methodo medendi, Paris, In Aedibus Rouillii, 1565.
- De Causis, signis ac locis morborum, Liber unus, Alexander Benatius, Bononiae, 1569.
- Commentarii in Hippocratis Coi Prognostica, Opus Divinum; Commentarii De Aere, aquis et locis opus, Henric Petrina Officina, Basel, 1568/1570.
- Opus novum, De Proportionibus numerorum, motuum, ponderum, sonorum, aliarumque rerum mensurandarum. Item de aliza regula, Henric Petrina, Basel, 1570.
- Opus novum, cunctis De Sanitate tuenda, Libri quattuor, Sebastian HenricPetri, Basle, 1569.
- De Vita propria, 1576 (autobiography).
  - Translation into English by J. Stoner (2002).
- Liber De Ludo aleae ("On Casting the Die"; on probability): posthumously published.
  - Translation into English by S.H. Gould (1961).
- Proxeneta, seu De Prudentia Civili (posthumously published: Paulus Marceau, Geneva, 1630).

=== Collected Works ===
A chronological key to this edition is supplied by M. Fierz.

- Hieronymi Cardani Mediolanensis Opera Omnia, cura Carolii Sponii (Lugduni, Ioannis Antonii Huguetan and Marci Antonii Ravaud, 1663) (10 volumes, Latin):
  - Volume 1: Philologica, Logica, Moralia (Internet Archive; another at Google; another at Google)
  - Volume 2: Moralia Quaedam et Physica (Google)
  - Volume 3: Physica (Google)
  - Volume 4: Arithmetica, Geometrica, Musica (Google)
  - Volume 5: Astronomica, Astrologica, Onirocritica (Internet Archive; another at Google)
  - Volume 6: Medicinalium I (Google)
  - Volume 7: Medicinalium II (Google)
  - Volume 8: Medicinalium III (Google)
  - Volume 9: Medicinalium IV (Google)
  - Volume 10: Opuscula Miscellanea (Google)

== See also ==
- Blow book, an early form of art or magic trick initially uncovered by Gerolamo Cardano
- Negative numbers, the core of Cardano's major contributions to science and mathematics
