= Lodovico Ferrari =

Italian mathematician (1522–1565)

Lodovico de Ferrari
- Born: 2 February 1522; Bologna
- Died: 5 October 1565 (aged 43); Bologna
- Known for: Solving the biquadratic equations
- Scientific career
- Fields: Mathematics
- Academic advisors: Gerolamo Cardano

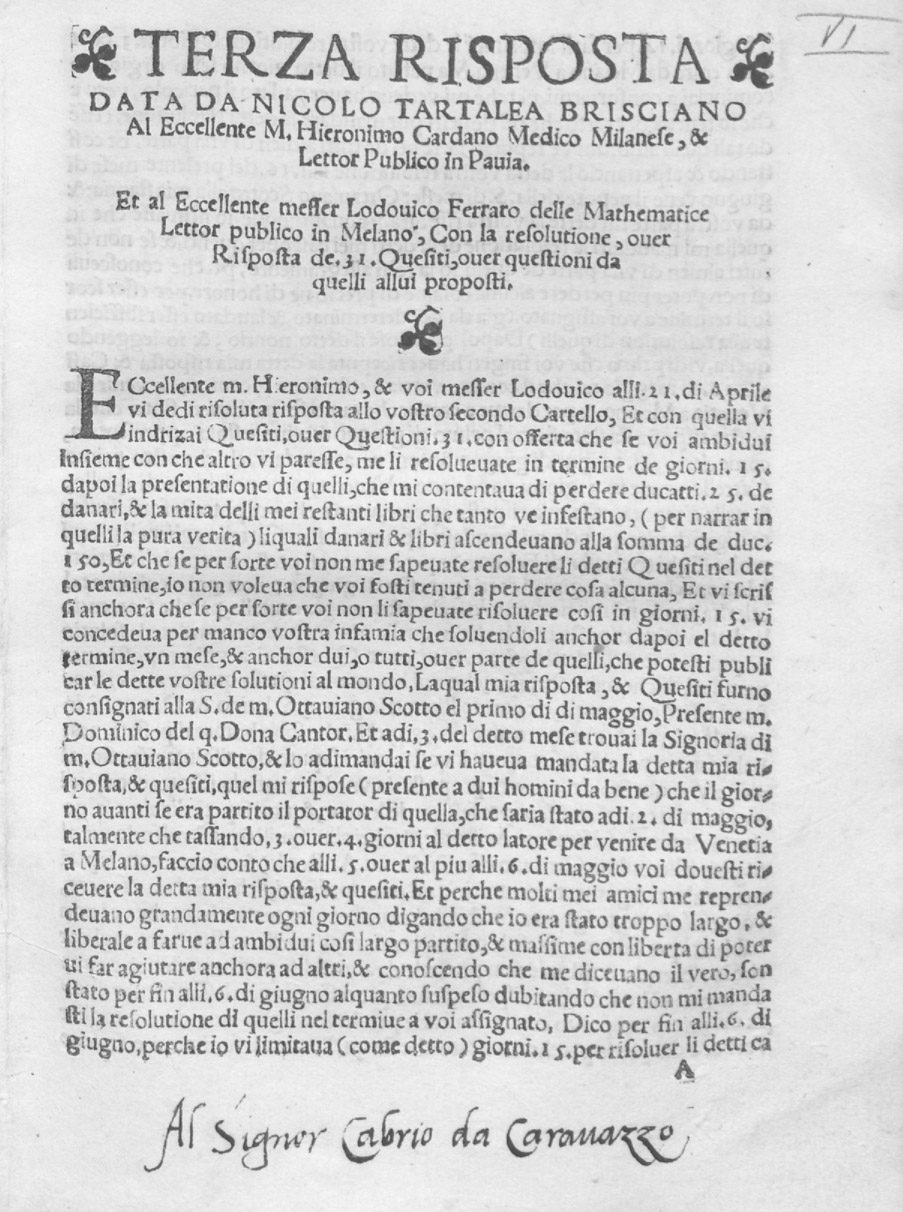
Niccolò Tartaglia, Terza risposta data a messer Hieronimo Cardano et a messer Lodovico Ferraro, 1547

Lodovico de Ferrari (2 February 1522 – 5 October 1565) was an Italian mathematician best known today for solving the quartic equation.

== Biography ==
Born in Bologna, Lodovico's grandfather, Bartolomeo Ferrari, was forced out of Milan to Bologna. Lodovico settled in Bologna, and he began his career as the servant of Gerolamo Cardano. He was extremely bright, so Cardano started teaching him mathematics. Ferrari aided Cardano on his solutions for quartic equations and cubic equations, and was mainly responsible for the solution of quartic equations that Cardano published. While still in his teens, Ferrari was able to obtain a prestigious teaching post in Rome after Cardano resigned from it and recommended him. Ferrari retired, when young at 42 years old, and wealthy. He then moved back to his hometown of Bologna, where he lived with his widowed sister Maddalena to take up a professorship of mathematics at the University of Bologna in 1565. Shortly thereafter, he died of white arsenic poisoning, according to a legend, by his sister.

== Cardano–Tartaglia formula ==
In 1545 a famous dispute erupted between Ferrari and Cardano's contemporary Niccolò Fontana Tartaglia, involving the solution to cubic equations. Widespread stories that Tartaglia devoted the rest of his life to ruining Ferrari's teacher and erstwhile master Cardano, however, appear to be fabricated. Mathematical historians now credit both Cardano and Tartaglia with the formula to solve cubic equations, referring to it as the "Cardano–Tartaglia formula".
