= History of mathematics =

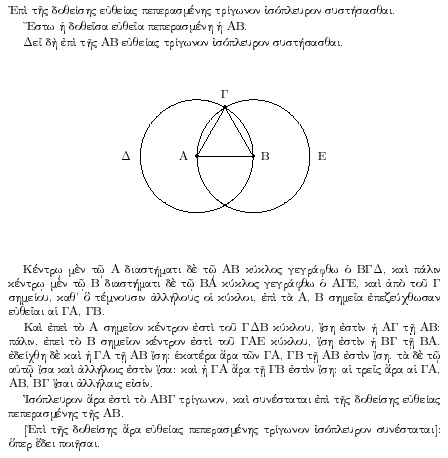
A proof from Euclid's Elements (c. 300 BC), considered the most influential textbook of all time

The history of mathematics deals with the origin of discoveries in mathematics and the mathematical methods and notation of the past. Before the modern age and worldwide spread of knowledge, written examples of new mathematical developments have come to light only in a few locales. From 3000 BC the Mesopotamian states of Sumer, Akkad and Assyria, followed closely by Ancient Egypt and the Levantine state of Ebla began using arithmetic, algebra and geometry for taxation, commerce, trade, and in astronomy, to record time and formulate calendars.

The earliest mathematical texts available are from Mesopotamia and Egypt – Plimpton 322 (Babylonian c. 2000 – 1900 BC), the Rhind Mathematical Papyrus (Egyptian c. 1800 BC) and the Moscow Mathematical Papyrus (Egyptian c. 1890 BC). All these texts mention the so-called Pythagorean triples, so, by inference, the Pythagorean theorem seems to be the most ancient and widespread mathematical development, after basic arithmetic and geometry.

The study of mathematics as a "demonstrative discipline" began in the 6th century BC with the Pythagoreans, who coined the term "mathematics" from the ancient Greek μάθημα (mathema), meaning "subject of instruction". Greek mathematics greatly refined the methods (especially through the introduction of deductive reasoning and mathematical rigor in proofs) and expanded the subject matter of mathematics. The ancient Romans used applied mathematics in surveying, structural engineering, mechanical engineering, bookkeeping, creation of lunar and solar calendars, and even arts and crafts. Chinese mathematics made early contributions, including a place value system and the first use of negative numbers. The Hindu–Arabic numeral system and the rules for the use of its operations, in use throughout the world today, evolved over the course of the first millennium AD in India and were transmitted to the Western world via Islamic mathematics through the work of Khwārizmī. Islamic mathematics, in turn, developed and expanded the mathematics known to these civilizations. Contemporaneous with but independent of these traditions were the mathematics developed by the Maya civilization of Mexico and Central America, where the concept of zero was given a standard symbol in Maya numerals. Many Greek and Arabic texts on mathematics were translated into Latin from the 12th century, leading to further development of mathematics in Medieval Europe. From ancient times through the Middle Ages, periods of mathematical discovery were often followed by centuries of stagnation. Beginning in Renaissance Italy in the 15th century, new mathematical developments, interacting with new scientific discoveries, were made at an increasing pace that continues through the present day. This includes the groundbreaking work of both Isaac Newton and Gottfried Wilhelm Leibniz in the development of infinitesimal calculus during the 17th century and subsequent discoveries of German mathematicians like Carl Friedrich Gauss and David Hilbert.

== Prehistoric ==
The origins of mathematical thought lie in the concepts of number, patterns in nature, magnitude, and form. Modern studies of animal cognition have shown that these concepts are not unique to humans. Such concepts would have been part of everyday life in hunter-gatherer societies. The idea of the "number" concept evolving gradually over time is supported by the existence of languages that preserve the distinction between "one", "two", and "many", but not of numbers larger than two.

The use of yarn by Neanderthals some 40,000 years ago at a site in Abri du Maras in the south of France suggests they knew basic concepts in mathematics. The Ishango bone, found near the headwaters of the Nile river (northeastern Congo), may be more than 20,000 years old and consists of a series of marks carved in three columns running the length of the bone. Common interpretations are that the Ishango bone shows either a tally of the earliest known demonstration of sequences of prime numbers or a six-month lunar calendar. Peter Rudman argues that the development of the concept of prime numbers could only have come about after the concept of division, which he dates to after 10,000 BC, with prime numbers probably not being understood until about 500 BC. He also writes that "no attempt has been made to explain why a tally of something should exhibit multiples of two, prime numbers between 10 and 20, and some numbers that are almost multiples of 10." The Ishango bone, according to scholar Alexander Marshack, may have influenced the later development of mathematics in Egypt as, like some entries on the Ishango bone, Egyptian arithmetic also made use of multiplication by 2; this however, is disputed.

Predynastic Egyptians of the 5th millennium BC pictorially represented geometric designs. It has been claimed that megalithic monuments in England and Scotland, dating from the 3rd millennium BC, incorporate geometric ideas such as circles, ellipses, and Pythagorean triples in their design. All of the above are disputed, however, and the currently oldest undisputed mathematical documents are from Babylonian and dynastic Egyptian sources.

== Babylonian ==
Babylonian mathematics refers to any mathematics of the peoples of Mesopotamia (modern Iraq) from the days of the early Sumerians through the Hellenistic period, almost to the dawn of Christianity. The majority of Babylonian mathematical work comes from two widely separated periods: The first few hundred years of the second millennium BC (Old Babylonian period) and the last few centuries of the first millennium BC (Seleucid period). It is named Babylonian mathematics due to the central role of Babylon as a place of study.

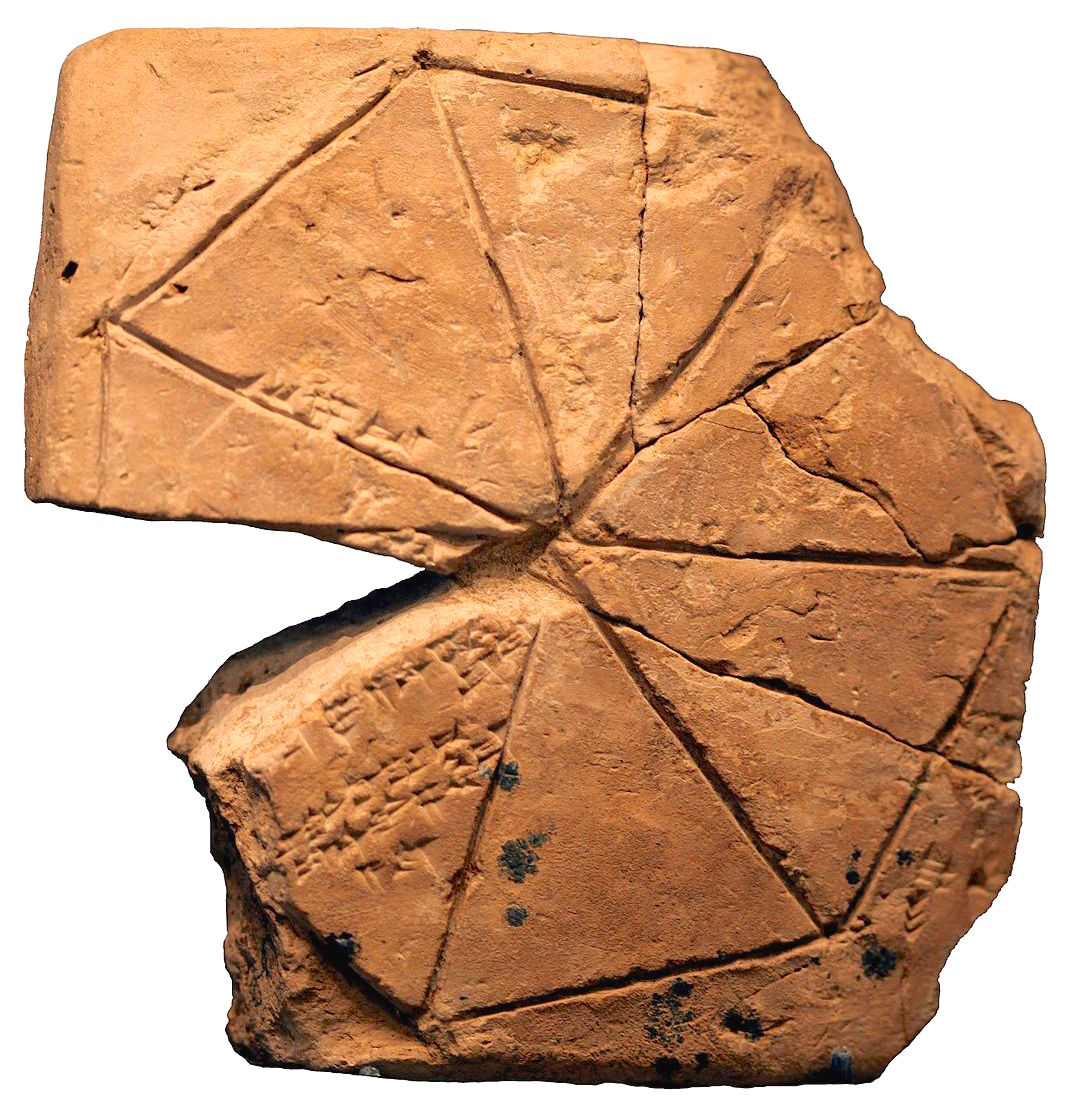
Geometry problem on a clay tablet belonging to a school for scribes; Susa, first half of the 2nd millennium BC

In contrast to the sparsity of sources in Egyptian mathematics, knowledge of Babylonian mathematics is derived from more than 400 clay tablets unearthed since the 1850s. Written in Cuneiform script, tablets were inscribed whilst the clay was moist, and baked hard in an oven or by the heat of the sun. Some of these appear to be graded homework.

The earliest evidence of written mathematics dates back to the ancient Sumerians, who built the earliest civilization in Mesopotamia. They developed a complex system of metrology from 3000 BC that was chiefly concerned with administrative/financial counting, such as grain allotments, workers, weights of silver, or even liquids, among other things. From around 2500 BC onward, the Sumerians wrote multiplication tables on clay tablets and dealt with geometrical exercises and division problems. The earliest traces of the Babylonian numerals also date back to this period.

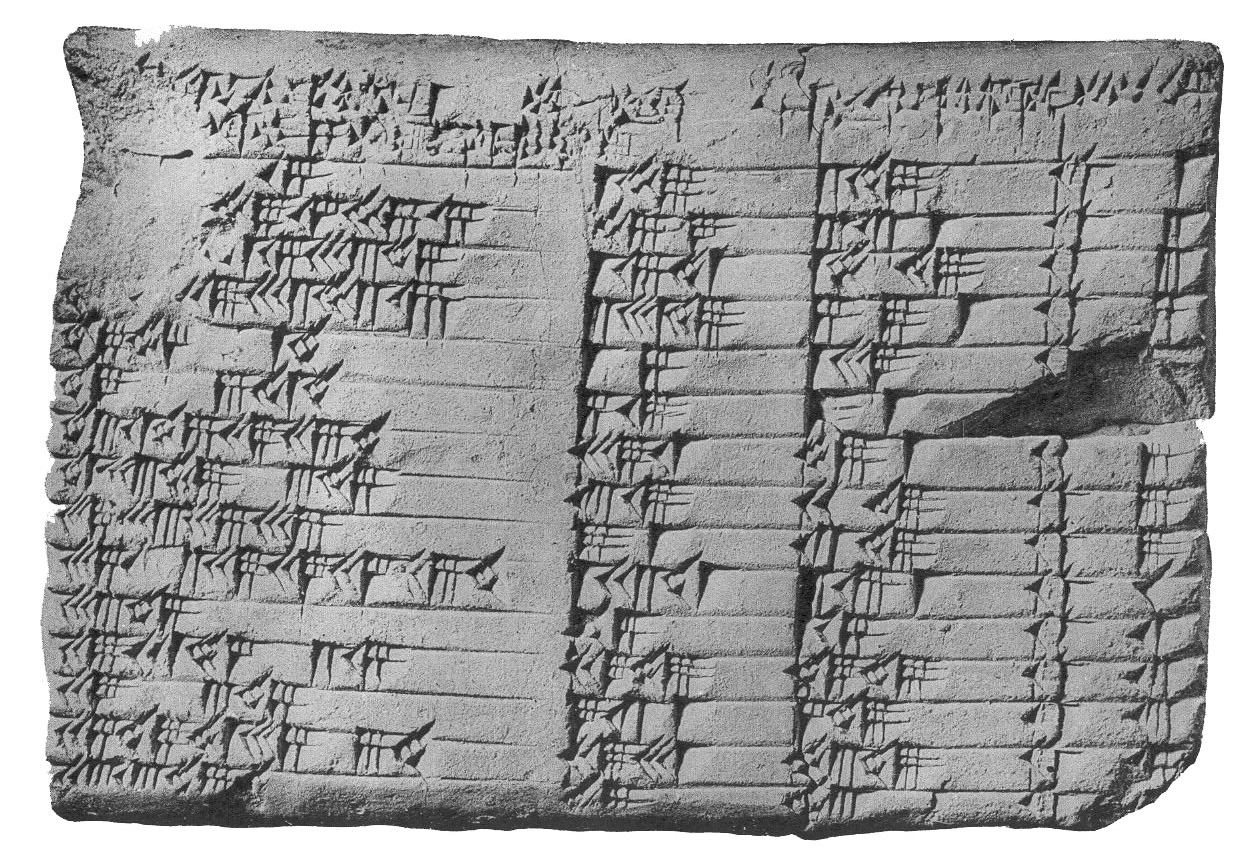
The Babylonian mathematical tablet Plimpton 322, dated to 1800 BC

Babylonian mathematics was written using a sexagesimal (base-60) numeral system. From this derives the modern-day usage of 60 seconds in a minute, 60 minutes in an hour, and 360 (60 × 6) degrees in a circle, as well as the use of seconds and minutes of arc to denote fractions of a degree. It is thought the sexagesimal system was initially used by Sumerian scribes because 60 can be evenly divided by 2, 3, 4, 5, 6, 10, 12, 15, 20 and 30, and for scribes (doling out the aforementioned grain allotments, recording weights of silver, etc.) being able to easily calculate by hand was essential, and so a sexagesimal system is pragmatically easier to calculate by hand with; however, there is the possibility that using a sexagesimal system was an ethno-linguistic phenomenon (that might not ever be known), and not a mathematical/practical decision. Also, unlike the Egyptians, Greeks, and Romans, the Babylonians had most of a place-value system, where digits written in the left column represented larger values, much as in the decimal system. The power of the Babylonian notational system lay in that it could be used to represent fractions as easily as whole numbers; thus, multiplying two numbers that contained fractions was no different from multiplying integers, similar to modern notation. The notational system of the Babylonians was the best of any civilization until the Renaissance, and its power allowed it to achieve remarkable computational accuracy; for example, the Babylonian tablet YBC 7289 gives an approximation of √2 accurate to five decimal places. The Babylonians lacked, however, an equivalent of the decimal point, and so the place value of a symbol often had to be inferred from the context. By the Seleucid period, the Babylonians had developed a zero symbol as a placeholder for empty positions; however, it was only used for intermediate positions. This zero sign does not appear in terminal positions; thus, the Babylonians came close but did not develop a true place value system.

Other topics covered by Babylonian mathematics include fractions, algebra, quadratic and cubic equations, and the calculation of regular numbers and their reciprocal pairs. The tablets also include multiplication tables and methods for solving linear, quadratic equations, and cubic equations, a remarkable achievement for the time. Tablets from the Old Babylonian period also contain the earliest known statement of the Pythagorean theorem. However, as with Egyptian mathematics, Babylonian mathematics shows no awareness of the difference between exact and approximate solutions, or the solvability of a problem, and most importantly, no explicit statement of the need for proofs or logical principles.

== Egyptian ==
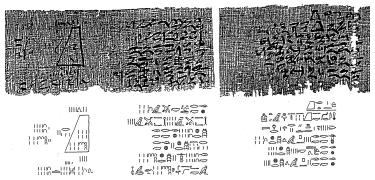
Image of Problem 14 from the Moscow Mathematical Papyrus. The problem includes a diagram indicating the dimensions of the truncated pyramid.

Egyptian mathematics refers to mathematics written in the Egyptian language. From the Hellenistic period, Greek replaced Egyptian as the written language of Egyptian scholars. Archaeological evidence has suggested that the Ancient Egyptian counting system had origins in Sub-Saharan Africa. Also, fractal geometry designs which are widespread among Sub-Saharan African cultures are also found in Egyptian architecture and cosmological signs. Megalithic structures located in Nabta Playa, Upper Egypt featured astronomy, calendar arrangements in alignment with the heliacal rising of Sirius and supported calibration the yearly calendar for the annual Nile flood.

The most extensive Egyptian mathematical text is the Rhind papyrus (sometimes also called the Ahmes Papyrus after its author), dated to c. 1650 BC but likely a copy of an older document from the Middle Kingdom of about 2000–1800 BC. It is an instruction manual for students in arithmetic and geometry. In addition to giving area formulas and methods for multiplication, division and working with unit fractions, it also contains evidence of other mathematical knowledge, including composite and prime numbers; arithmetic, geometric and harmonic means; and simplistic understandings of both the Sieve of Eratosthenes and perfect number theory (namely, that of the number 6). It also shows how to solve first order linear equations as well as arithmetic and geometric series.

Another significant Egyptian mathematical text is the Moscow papyrus, also from the Middle Kingdom period, dated to c. 1890 BC. It consists of what are today called word problems or story problems, which were apparently intended as entertainment. One problem is considered to be of particular importance because it gives a method for finding the volume of a frustum (truncated pyramid).

Finally, the Berlin Papyrus 6619 (c. 1800 BC) shows that ancient Egyptians could solve a second-order algebraic equation.

== Greek ==
The Pythagorean theorem. The Pythagoreans are generally credited with the first proof of the theorem.

Greek mathematics refers to the mathematics written in the Greek language from the time of Thales of Miletus (~600 BC) to the closure of the Academy of Athens in 529 AD. Greek mathematicians lived in cities spread over the entire Eastern Mediterranean, from Italy to North Africa, but were united by culture and language. Greek mathematics of the period following Alexander the Great is sometimes called Hellenistic mathematics.

Greek mathematics was much more sophisticated than the mathematics that had been developed by earlier cultures. All surviving records of pre-Greek mathematics show the use of inductive reasoning, that is, repeated observations used to establish rules of thumb. Greek mathematicians, by contrast, used deductive reasoning. The Greeks used logic to derive conclusions from definitions and axioms, and used mathematical rigor to prove them.

Greek mathematics is thought to have begun with Thales of Miletus (c. 624 – c. 546 BC) and Pythagoras of Samos (c. 582 – c. 507 BC). Although the extent of the influence is disputed, they were probably inspired by Egyptian and Babylonian mathematics. According to legend, Pythagoras traveled to Egypt to learn mathematics, geometry, and astronomy from Egyptian priests.

Thales used geometry to solve problems such as calculating the height of pyramids and the distance of ships from the shore. He is credited with the first use of deductive reasoning applied to geometry, by deriving four corollaries to Thales' Theorem. As a result, he has been hailed as the first true mathematician and the first known individual to whom a mathematical discovery has been attributed. Pythagoras established the Pythagorean School, whose doctrine it was that mathematics ruled the universe and whose motto was "All is number". It was the Pythagoreans who coined the term "mathematics", and with whom the study of mathematics for its own sake begins. The Pythagoreans are credited with the first proof of the Pythagorean theorem, though the statement of the theorem has a long history, and with the proof of the existence of irrational numbers. Although he was preceded by the Babylonians, Indians and the Chinese, the Neopythagorean mathematician Nicomachus (60–120 AD) provided one of the earliest Greco-Roman multiplication tables, whereas the oldest extant Greek multiplication table is found on a wax tablet dated to the 1st century AD (now found in the British Museum). The association of the Neopythagoreans with the Western invention of the multiplication table is evident in its later Medieval name: the mensa Pythagorica.

Plato (428/427 BC – 348/347 BC) is important in the history of mathematics for inspiring and guiding others. His Platonic Academy, in Athens, became the mathematical center of the world in the 4th century BC, and it was from this school that the leading mathematicians of the day, such as Eudoxus of Cnidus (c. 390 – c. 340 BC), came. Plato also discussed the foundations of mathematics, clarified some of the definitions (e.g. that of a line as "breadthless length").

Eudoxus developed the method of exhaustion, a precursor of modern integration and a theory of ratios that avoided the problem of incommensurable magnitudes. The former allowed the calculations of areas and volumes of curvilinear figures, while the latter enabled subsequent geometers to make significant advances in geometry. Though he made no specific technical mathematical discoveries, Aristotle (384–c. 322 BC) contributed significantly to the development of mathematics by laying the foundations of logic.

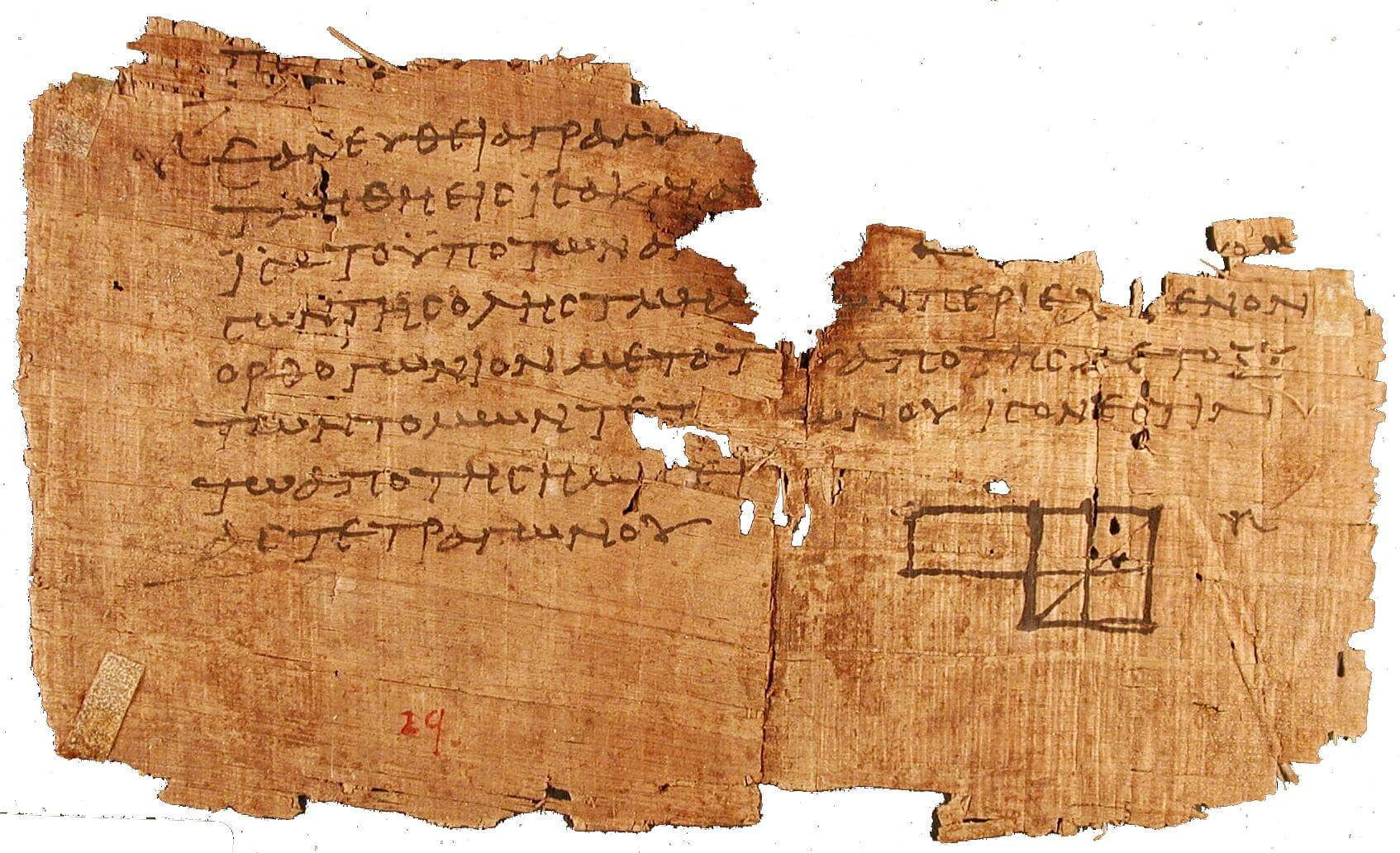
One of the oldest surviving fragments of Euclid's Elements, found at Oxyrhynchus and dated to circa AD 100. The diagram accompanies Book II, Proposition 5.

In the 3rd century BC, the premier center of mathematical education and research was the Musaeum of Alexandria. It was there that Euclid (c. 300 BC) taught, and wrote the Elements, widely considered the most successful and influential textbook of all time. The Elements introduced mathematical rigor through the axiomatic method and is the earliest example of the format still used in mathematics today, that of definition, axiom, theorem, and proof. Although most of the contents of the Elements were already known, Euclid arranged them into a single, coherent logical framework. The Elements was known to all educated people in the West up through the middle of the 20th century and its contents are still taught in geometry classes today. In addition to the familiar theorems of Euclidean geometry, the Elements was meant as an introductory textbook to all mathematical subjects of the time, such as number theory, algebra and solid geometry, including proofs that the square root of two is irrational and that there are infinitely many prime numbers. Euclid also wrote extensively on other subjects, such as conic sections, optics, spherical geometry, and mechanics, but only half of his writings survive.

Archimedes used the method of exhaustion to approximate the value of pi.

Archimedes (c. 287–212 BC) of Syracuse, widely considered the greatest mathematician of antiquity, used the method of exhaustion to calculate the area under the arc of a parabola with the summation of an infinite series, in a manner not too dissimilar from modern calculus. He also showed one could use the method of exhaustion to calculate the value of π with as much precision as desired, and obtained the most accurate value of π then known, 3+10/71 < π < 3+10/70. He also studied the spiral bearing his name, obtained formulas for the volumes of surfaces of revolution (paraboloid, ellipsoid, hyperboloid), and an ingenious method of exponentiation for expressing very large numbers. While he is also known for his contributions to physics and several advanced mechanical devices, Archimedes himself placed far greater value on the products of his thought and general mathematical principles. He regarded as his greatest achievement his finding of the surface area and volume of a sphere, which he obtained by proving these are 2/3 the surface area and volume of a cylinder circumscribing the sphere.

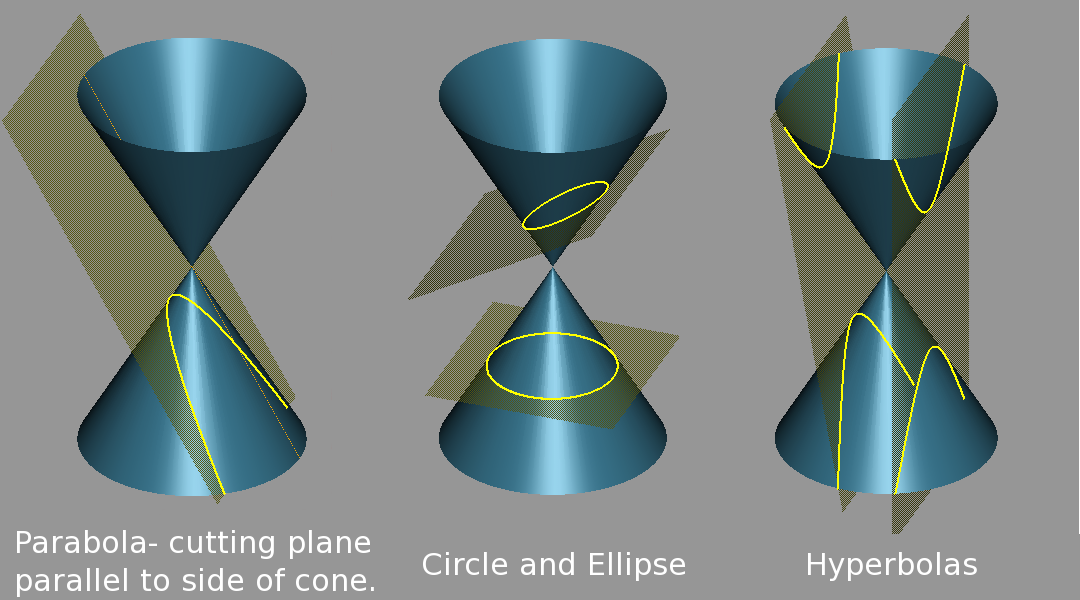
Apollonius of Perga made significant advances in the study of conic sections.

Apollonius of Perga (c. 262–190 BC) made significant advances to the study of conic sections, showing that one can obtain all three varieties of conic section by varying the angle of the plane that cuts a double-napped cone. He also coined the terminology in use today for conic sections, namely parabola ("place beside" or "comparison"), "ellipse" ("deficiency"), and "hyperbola" ("a throw beyond"). His work Conics is one of the best known and preserved mathematical works from antiquity, and in it he derives many theorems concerning conic sections that would prove invaluable to later mathematicians and astronomers studying planetary motion, such as Isaac Newton. While neither Apollonius nor any other Greek mathematicians made the leap to coordinate geometry, Apollonius' treatment of curves is in some ways similar to the modern treatment, and some of his work seems to anticipate the development of analytical geometry by Descartes some 1800 years later.

Around the same time, Eratosthenes of Cyrene (c. 276–194 BC) devised the Sieve of Eratosthenes for finding prime numbers. The 3rd century BC is generally regarded as the "Golden Age" of Greek mathematics, with advances in pure mathematics henceforth in relative decline. Nevertheless, in the centuries that followed significant advances were made in applied mathematics, most notably trigonometry, largely to address the needs of astronomers. Hipparchus of Nicaea (c. 190–120 BC) is considered the founder of trigonometry for compiling the first known trigonometric table, and to him is also due the systematic use of the 360 degree circle. Heron of Alexandria (c. 10–70 AD) is credited with Heron's formula for finding the area of a scalene triangle and with being the first to recognize the possibility of negative numbers possessing square roots. Menelaus of Alexandria (c. 100 AD) pioneered spherical trigonometry through Menelaus' theorem. The most complete and influential trigonometric work of antiquity is the Almagest of Ptolemy (c. AD 90–168), a landmark astronomical treatise whose trigonometric tables would be used by astronomers for the next thousand years. Ptolemy is also credited with Ptolemy's theorem for deriving trigonometric quantities, and the most accurate value of π outside of China until the medieval period, 3.1416.

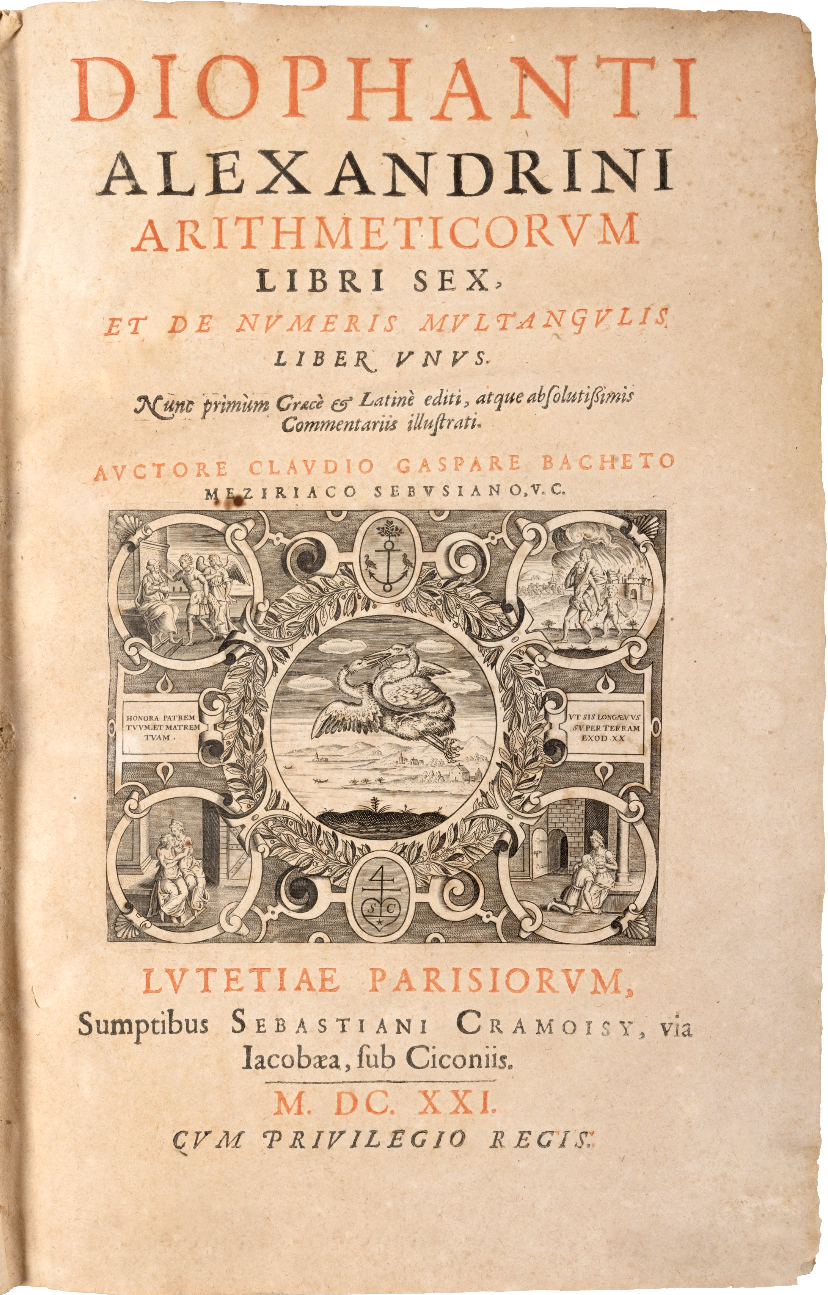
Title page of the 1621 edition of Diophantus' Arithmetica, translated into Latin by Claude Gaspard Bachet de Méziriac

Following a period of stagnation after Ptolemy, the period between 250 and 350 AD is sometimes referred to as the "Silver Age" of Greek mathematics. During this period, Diophantus made significant advances in algebra, particularly indeterminate analysis, which is also known as "Diophantine analysis". The study of Diophantine equations and Diophantine approximations is a significant area of research to this day. His main work was the Arithmetica, a collection of 150 algebraic problems dealing with exact solutions to determinate and indeterminate equations. The Arithmetica had a significant influence on later mathematicians, such as Pierre de Fermat, who arrived at his famous Last Theorem after trying to generalize a problem he had read in the Arithmetica (that of dividing a square into two squares). Diophantus also made significant advances in notation, the Arithmetica being the first instance of algebraic symbolism and syncopation.

The Hagia Sophia was designed by mathematicians Anthemius of Tralles and Isidore of Miletus.

Among the last great Greek mathematicians is Pappus of Alexandria (4th century AD). He is known for his hexagon theorem and centroid theorem, as well as the Pappus configuration and Pappus graph. His Collection is a major source of knowledge on Greek mathematics as most of it has survived. Pappus is considered the last major innovator in Greek mathematics, with subsequent work consisting mostly of commentaries on earlier work.

The first woman mathematician recorded was Hypatia of Alexandria (AD 350–415), who wrote many works on applied mathematics. Because of a political dispute, the Christian community in Alexandria had her stripped publicly and executed. Her death is sometimes taken as the end of the era of the Alexandrian Greek mathematics, although work did continue in Athens for another century with figures such as Proclus, Simplicius and Eutocius. Although Proclus and Simplicius were more philosophers than mathematicians, their commentaries on earlier works are valuable sources on Greek mathematics. The closure of the neo-Platonic Academy of Athens by the emperor Justinian in 529 AD is traditionally held as marking the end of the era of Greek mathematics, although the Greek tradition continued unbroken in the Byzantine empire with mathematicians such as Anthemius of Tralles and Isidore of Miletus, the architects of the Hagia Sophia. Nevertheless, Byzantine mathematics consisted mostly of commentaries, with little in the way of innovation, and the centers of mathematical innovation were to be found elsewhere by this time.

== Roman ==
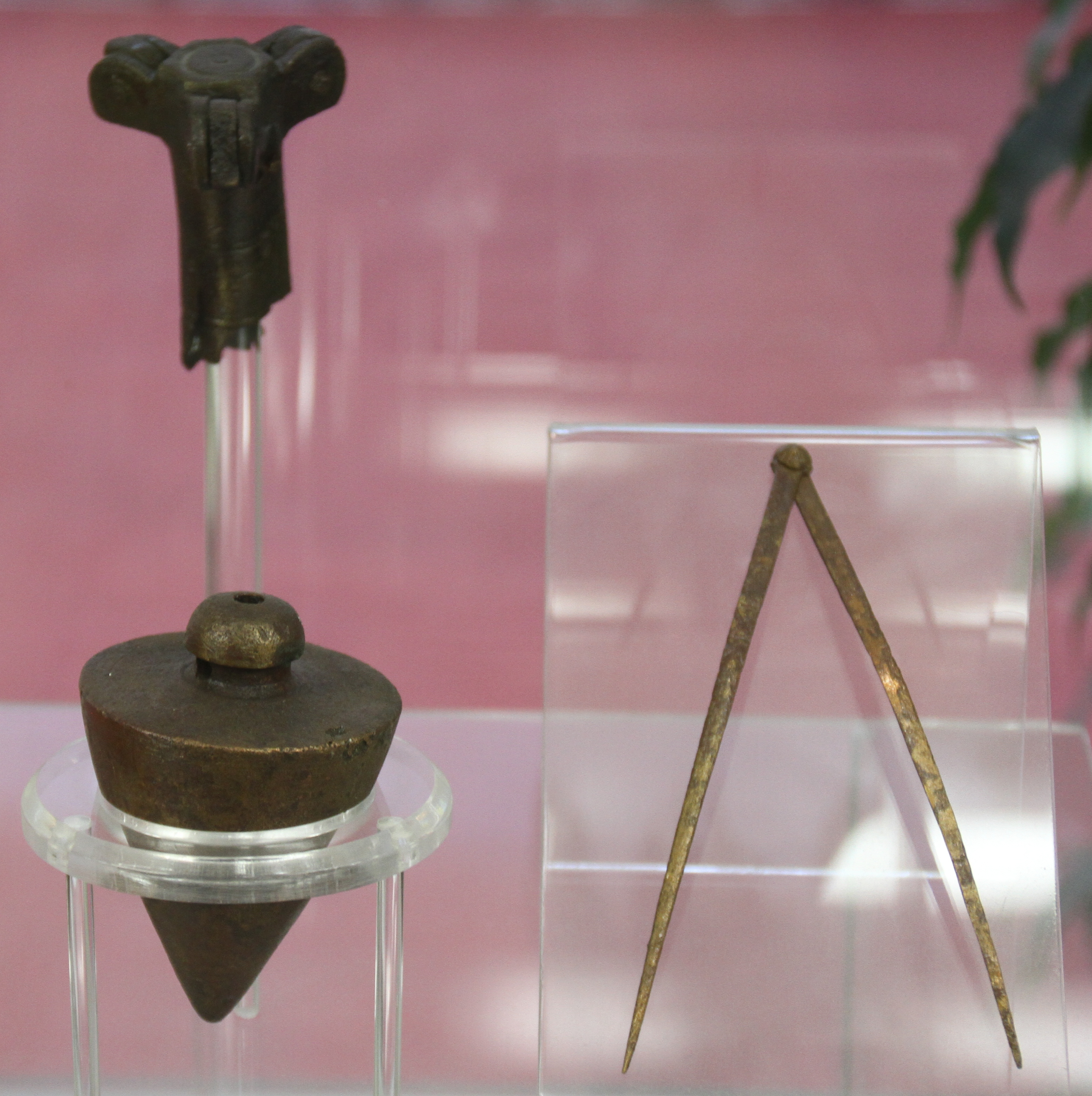
Equipment used by an ancient Roman land surveyor (gromatici), found at the site of Aquincum, modern Budapest, Hungary

Although ethnic Greek mathematicians continued under the rule of the late Roman Republic and subsequent Roman Empire, there were no noteworthy native Latin mathematicians in comparison. Ancient Romans such as Cicero (106–43 BC), an influential Roman statesman who studied mathematics in Greece, believed that Roman surveyors and calculators were far more interested in applied mathematics than the theoretical mathematics and geometry that were prized by the Greeks. It is unclear if the Romans first derived their numerical system directly from the Greek precedent or from Etruscan numerals used by the Etruscan civilization centered in what is now Tuscany, central Italy.

Using calculation, Romans were adept at both instigating and detecting financial fraud, as well as managing taxes for the treasury. Siculus Flaccus, one of the Roman gromatici (i.e. land surveyor), wrote the Categories of Fields, which aided Roman surveyors in measuring the surface areas of allotted lands and territories. Aside from managing trade and taxes, the Romans also regularly applied mathematics to solve problems in engineering, including the erection of architecture such as bridges, road-building, and preparation for military campaigns. Arts and crafts such as Roman mosaics, inspired by previous Greek designs, created illusionist geometric patterns and rich, detailed scenes that required precise measurements for each tessera tile, the opus tessellatum pieces on average measuring eight millimeters square and the finer opus vermiculatum pieces having an average surface of four millimeters square.

The creation of the Roman calendar also necessitated basic mathematics. The first calendar allegedly dates back to 8th century BC during the Roman Kingdom and included 356 days plus a leap year every other year. In contrast, the lunar calendar of the Republican era contained 355 days, roughly ten-and-one-fourth days shorter than the solar year, a discrepancy that was solved by adding an extra month into the calendar after the 23rd of February. This calendar was supplanted by the Julian calendar, a solar calendar organized by Julius Caesar (100–44 BC) and devised by Sosigenes of Alexandria to include a leap day every four years in a 365-day cycle. This calendar, which contained an error of 11 minutes and 14 seconds, was later corrected by the Gregorian calendar organized by Pope Gregory XIII (r. 1572–1585), virtually the same solar calendar used in modern times as the international standard calendar.

At roughly the same time, the Han Chinese and the Romans both invented the wheeled odometer device for measuring distances traveled, the Roman model first described by the Roman civil engineer and architect Vitruvius (c. 80 BC – c. 15 BC). The device was used at least until the reign of emperor Commodus (r. 177 – 192 AD), but its design seems to have been lost until experiments were made during the 15th century in Western Europe. Perhaps relying on similar gear-work and technology found in the Antikythera mechanism, the odometer of Vitruvius featured chariot wheels measuring 4 feet (1.2 m) in diameter turning four-hundred times in one Roman mile (roughly 4590 ft/1400 m). With each revolution, a pin-and-axle device engaged a 400-tooth cogwheel that turned a second gear responsible for dropping pebbles into a box, each pebble representing one mile traversed.

== Chinese ==
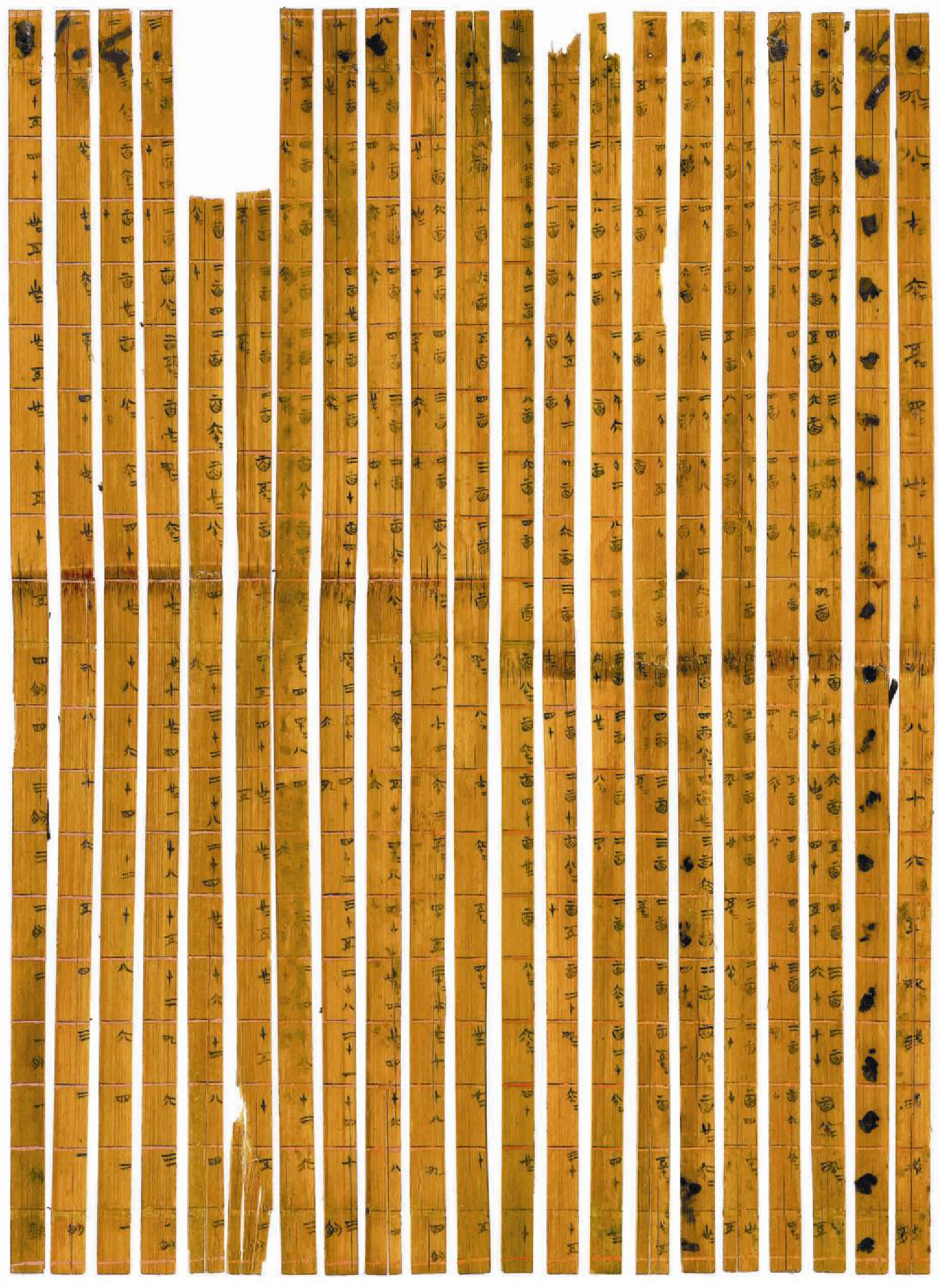
The Tsinghua Bamboo Slips, containing the world's earliest decimal multiplication table, dated 305 BC during the Warring States period

An analysis of early Chinese mathematics has demonstrated its unique development compared to other parts of the world, leading scholars to assume an entirely independent development. The oldest extant mathematical text from China is the Zhoubi Suanjing (周髀算經), variously dated to between 1200 BC and 100 BC, though a date of about 300 BC during the Warring States Period appears reasonable. However, the Tsinghua Bamboo Slips, containing the earliest known decimal multiplication table (although ancient Babylonians had ones with a base of 60), is dated around 305 BC and is perhaps the oldest surviving mathematical text of China.

Counting rod numerals

Of particular note is the use in Chinese mathematics of a decimal positional notation system, the so-called "rod numerals" in which distinct ciphers were used for numbers between 1 and 10, and additional ciphers for powers of ten. Thus, the number 123 would be written using the symbol for "1", followed by the symbol for "100", then the symbol for "2" followed by the symbol for "10", followed by the symbol for "3". This was the most advanced number system in the world at the time, apparently in use several centuries before the common era and well before the development of the Indian numeral system. Rod numerals allowed the representation of numbers as large as desired and allowed calculations to be carried out on the suan pan, or Chinese abacus. The date of the invention of the suan pan is not certain, but the earliest written mention dates from AD 190, in Xu Yue's Supplementary Notes on the Art of Figures.

The oldest extant work on geometry in China comes from the philosophical Mohist canon c. 330 BC, compiled by the followers of Mozi (470–390 BC). The Mo Jing described various aspects of many fields associated with physical science, and provided a small number of geometrical theorems as well. It also defined the concepts of circumference, diameter, radius, and volume.

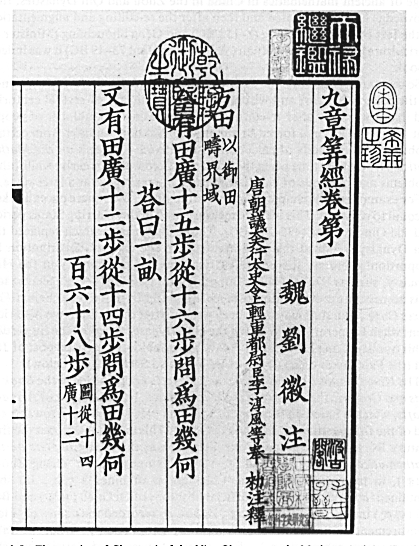
The Nine Chapters on the Mathematical Art, one of the earliest surviving mathematical texts from China (2nd century AD)

In 212 BC, the Emperor Qin Shi Huang commanded all books in the Qin Empire other than officially sanctioned ones be burned. This decree was not universally obeyed, but as a consequence of this order little is known about ancient Chinese mathematics before this date. After the book burning of 212 BC, the Han dynasty (202 BC–220 AD) produced works of mathematics which presumably expanded on works that are now lost. The most important of these is The Nine Chapters on the Mathematical Art, the full title of which appeared by AD 179, but existed in part under other titles beforehand. It consists of 246 word problems involving agriculture, business, employment of geometry to figure height spans and dimension ratios for Chinese pagoda towers, engineering, surveying, and includes material on right triangles. It created mathematical proof for the Pythagorean theorem, and a mathematical formula for Gaussian elimination. The treatise also provides values of π, which Chinese mathematicians originally approximated as 3 until Liu Xin (d. 23 AD) provided a figure of 3.1457 and subsequently Zhang Heng (78–139) approximated pi as 3.1724, as well as 3.162 by taking the square root of 10. Liu Hui commented on the Nine Chapters in the 3rd century AD and gave a value of π accurate to 5 decimal places (i.e. 3.14159). Though more of a matter of computational stamina than theoretical insight, in the 5th century AD Zu Chongzhi computed the value of π to seven decimal places (between 3.1415926 and 3.1415927), which remained the most accurate value of π for almost the next 1000 years. He also established a method which would later be called Cavalieri's principle to find the volume of a sphere.

The high-water mark of Chinese mathematics occurred in the 13th century during the latter half of the Song dynasty (960–1279), with the development of Chinese algebra. The most important text from that period is the Precious Mirror of the Four Elements by Zhu Shijie (1249–1314), dealing with the solution of simultaneous higher order algebraic equations using a method similar to Horner's method. The Precious Mirror also contains a diagram of Pascal's triangle with coefficients of binomial expansions through the eighth power, though both appear in Chinese works as early as 1100. The Chinese also made use of the complex combinatorial diagram known as the magic square and magic circles, described in ancient times and perfected by Yang Hui (AD 1238–1298).

Even after European mathematics began to flourish during the Renaissance, European and Chinese mathematics were separate traditions, with significant Chinese mathematical output in decline from the 13th century onwards. Jesuit missionaries such as Matteo Ricci carried mathematical ideas back and forth between the two cultures from the 16th to 18th centuries, though at this point far more mathematical ideas were entering China than leaving.

Japanese mathematics, Korean mathematics, and Vietnamese mathematics are traditionally viewed as stemming from Chinese mathematics and belonging to the Confucian-based East Asian cultural sphere. Korean and Japanese mathematics were heavily influenced by the algebraic works produced during China's Song dynasty, whereas Vietnamese mathematics was heavily indebted to popular works of China's Ming dynasty (1368–1644). For instance, although Vietnamese mathematical treatises were written in either Chinese or the native Vietnamese Chữ Nôm script, all of them followed the Chinese format of presenting a collection of problems with algorithms for solving them, followed by numerical answers. Mathematics in Vietnam and Korea were mostly associated with the professional court bureaucracy of mathematicians and astronomers, whereas in Japan it was more prevalent in the realm of private schools.

== Indian ==
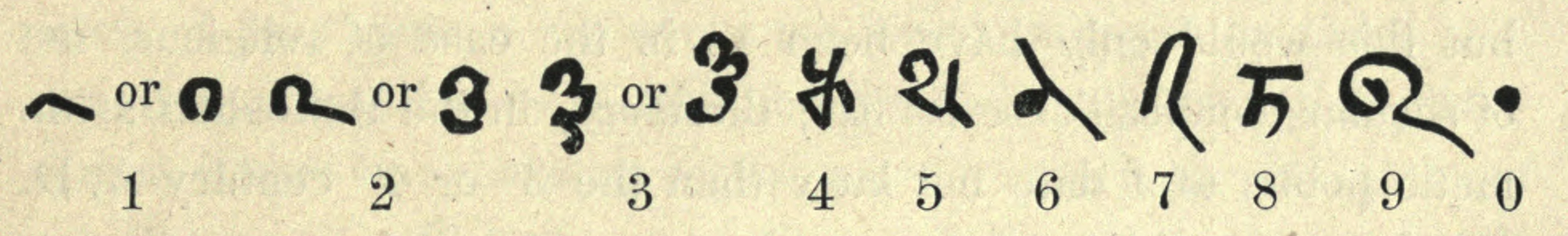
The numerals used in the Bakhshali manuscript, dated between the 2nd century BC and the 2nd century AD

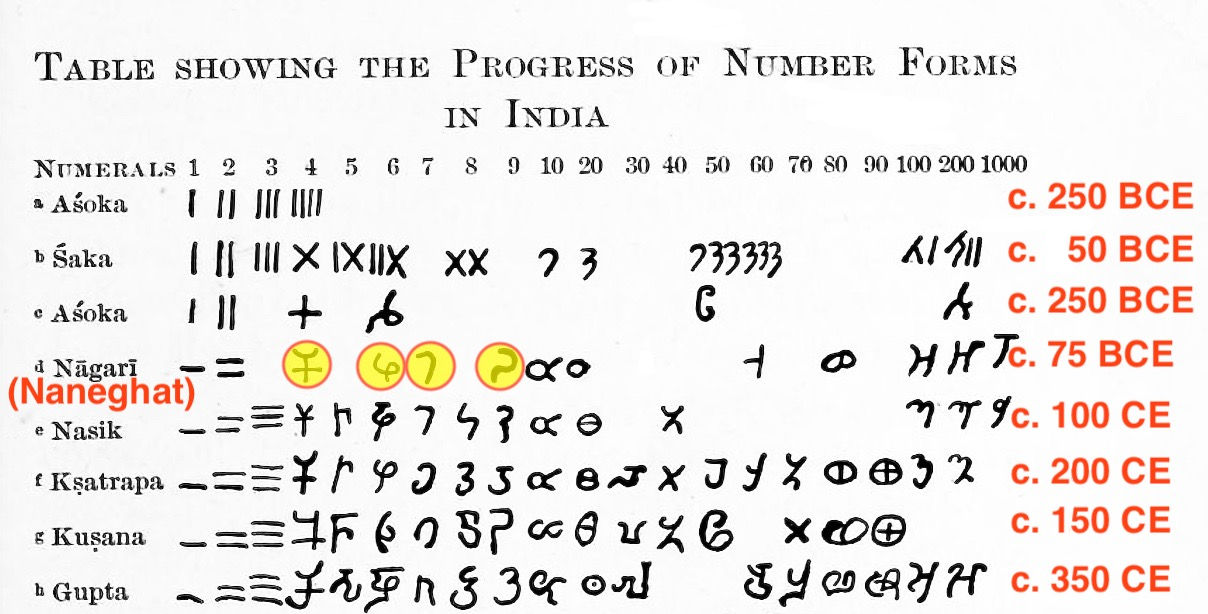
Indian numerals in stone and copper inscriptions

Ancient Brahmi numerals in a part of India

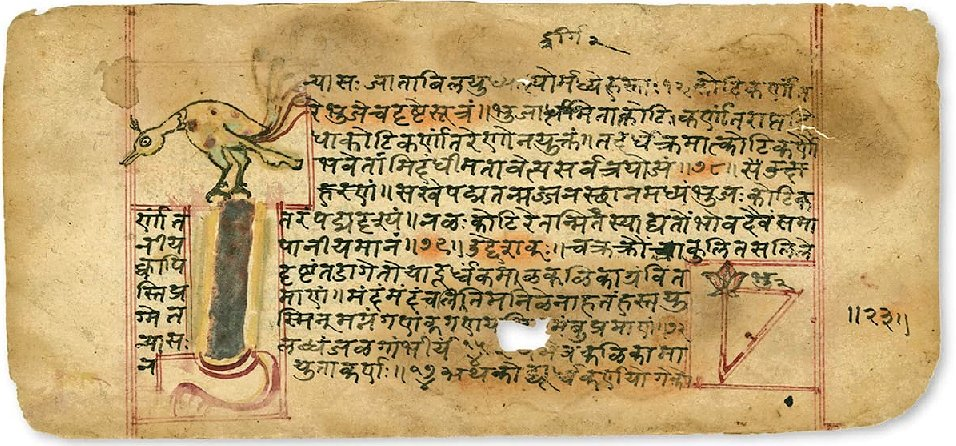
Page from Lilavati, the first volume of Siddhānta Śiromaṇī. Use of the Pythagorean theorem in the corner. 1650 edition.

The earliest civilization on the Indian subcontinent is the Indus Valley civilization (mature second phase: 2600 to 1900 BC) that flourished in the Indus river basin. Their cities were laid out with geometric regularity, but no known mathematical documents survive from this civilization.

The oldest extant mathematical records from India are the Sulba Sutras (dated variously between the 8th century BC and the 2nd century AD), appendices to religious texts which give simple rules for constructing altars of various shapes, such as squares, rectangles, parallelograms, and others. As with Egypt, the preoccupation with temple functions points to an origin of mathematics in religious ritual. The Sulba Sutras give methods for constructing a circle with approximately the same area as a given square, which imply several different approximations of the value of π. (Note: The approximate values for π are 4 × (13/15)^{2} (3.0044...), 25/8 (3.125), 900/289 (3.11418685...), 1156/361 (3.202216...), and 339/108 (3.1389)) In addition, they compute the square root of 2 to several decimal places, list Pythagorean triples, and give a statement of the Pythagorean theorem. All of these results are present in Babylonian mathematics, indicating Mesopotamian influence. It is not known to what extent the Sulba Sutras influenced later Indian mathematicians. As in China, there is a lack of continuity in Indian mathematics; significant advances are separated by long periods of inactivity.

Pāṇini (c. 5th century BC) formulated the rules for Sanskrit grammar. His notation was similar to modern mathematical notation, and used metarules, transformations, and recursion. Pingala (roughly 3rd–1st centuries BC) in his treatise of prosody uses a device corresponding to a binary numeral system. His discussion of the combinatorics of meters corresponds to an elementary version of the binomial theorem. Pingala's work also contains the basic ideas of Fibonacci numbers (called mātrāmeru).

The next significant mathematical documents from India after the Sulba Sutras are the Siddhantas, astronomical treatises from the 4th and 5th centuries AD (Gupta period) showing strong Hellenistic influence. They are significant in that they contain the first instance of trigonometric relations based on the half-chord, as is the case in modern trigonometry, rather than the full chord, as was the case in Ptolemaic trigonometry. Through a series of translation errors, the words "sine" and "cosine" derive from the Sanskrit "jiya" and "kojiya".

Explanation of the sine rule in Yuktibhāṣā

Around 500 AD, Aryabhata wrote the Aryabhatiya, a slim volume, written in verse, intended to supplement the rules of calculation used in astronomy and mathematical mensuration, though with no feeling for logic or deductive methodology. It is in the Aryabhatiya that the decimal place-value system first appears. Several centuries later, the Muslim mathematician Abu Rayhan Biruni described the Aryabhatiya as a "mix of common pebbles and costly crystals".

In the 7th century, Brahmagupta identified the Brahmagupta theorem, Brahmagupta's identity and Brahmagupta's formula, and for the first time, in Brahma-sphuta-siddhanta, he lucidly explained the use of zero as both a placeholder and decimal digit, and explained the Hindu–Arabic numeral system. It was from a translation of this Indian text on mathematics (c. 770) that Islamic mathematicians were introduced to this numeral system, which they adapted as Arabic numerals. Islamic scholars carried knowledge of this number system to Europe by the 12th century, and it has now displaced all older number systems throughout the world. Various symbol sets are used to represent numbers in the Hindu–Arabic numeral system, all of which evolved from the Brahmi numerals. Each of the roughly dozen major scripts of India has its own numeral glyphs. In the 10th century, Halayudha's commentary on Pingala's work contains a study of the Fibonacci sequence and Pascal's triangle.

In the 12th century, Bhāskara II, who lived in southern India, wrote extensively on the mathematical knowledge of his time. In his astronomical work, he described results that have been interpreted by later scholars as resembling early infinitesimal methods. His writings include ideas approximately equivalent to infinitesimals and a special case of the mean value theorem in inverse interpolation of sine.He also made significant contributions to algebra, including methods for solving indeterminate equations of the type later known as Pell equations, which he treated using cyclic procedures such as the chakravāla method. In the 14th century, Narayana Pandita completed his Ganita Kaumudi.

Also in the 14th century, Madhava of Sangamagrama, the founder of the Kerala School of Mathematics, found the Madhava–Leibniz series and obtained from it a transformed series, whose first 21 terms he used to compute the value of π as 3.14159265359. Madhava also found the Madhava-Gregory series to determine the arctangent, the Madhava-Newton power series to determine sine and cosine and the Taylor approximation for sine and cosine functions. In the 16th century, Jyesthadeva consolidated many of the Kerala School's developments and theorems in the Yukti-bhāṣā. has been argued that certain ideas of calculus like infinite series and taylor series of some trigonometry functions, were transmitted to Europe in the 16th century via Jesuit missionaries and traders who were active around the ancient port of Muziris at the time and, as a result, directly influenced later European developments in analysis and calculus. However, other scholars argue that the Kerala School did not formulate a systematic theory of differentiation and integration, and that there is not any direct evidence of their results being transmitted outside Kerala.

== Islamic empires ==
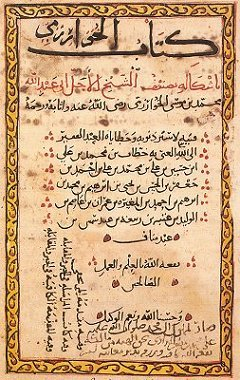
Page from The Compendious Book on Calculation by Completion and Balancing by Muhammad ibn Mūsā al-Khwārizmī (c. 820 AD)

The Islamic Empire established across the Middle East, Central Asia, North Africa, Iberia, and in parts of India in the 8th century made significant contributions towards mathematics. Although most Islamic texts on mathematics were written in Arabic, they were not all written by Arabs, since much like the status of Greek in the Hellenistic world, Arabic was used as the written language of non-Arab scholars throughout the Islamic world at the time.

In the 9th century, the Persian mathematician Muḥammad ibn Mūsā al-Khwārizmī wrote an important book on the Hindu–Arabic numerals and one on methods for solving equations. His book On the Calculation with Hindu Numerals, written about 825, along with the work of Al-Kindi, were instrumental in spreading Indian mathematics and Indian numerals to the West. The word algorithm is derived from the Latinization of his name, Algoritmi, and the word algebra from the title of one of his works, Al-Kitāb al-mukhtaṣar fī hīsāb al-ğabr wa'l-muqābala (The Compendious Book on Calculation by Completion and Balancing). He gave an exhaustive explanation for the algebraic solution of quadratic equations with positive roots, and he was the first to teach algebra in an elementary form and for its own sake. He also discussed the fundamental method of "reduction" and "balancing", referring to the transposition of subtracted terms to the other side of an equation, that is, the cancellation of like terms on opposite sides of the equation. This is the operation which al-Khwārizmī originally described as al-jabr. His algebra was also no longer concerned "with a series of problems to be resolved, but an exposition which starts with primitive terms in which the combinations must give all possible prototypes for equations, which henceforward explicitly constitute the true object of study." He also studied an equation for its own sake and "in a generic manner, insofar as it does not simply emerge in the course of solving a problem, but is specifically called on to define an infinite class of problems."

In Egypt, Abu Kamil extended algebra to the set of irrational numbers, accepting square roots and fourth roots as solutions and coefficients to quadratic equations. He also developed techniques used to solve three non-linear simultaneous equations with three unknown variables. One unique feature of his works was trying to find all the possible solutions to some of his problems, including one where he found 2676 solutions. His works formed an important foundation for the development of algebra and influenced later mathematicians, such as al-Karaji and Fibonacci.

Further developments in algebra were made by Al-Karaji in his treatise al-Fakhri, where he extends the methodology to incorporate integer powers and integer roots of unknown quantities. Something close to a proof by mathematical induction appears in a book written by Al-Karaji around 1000 AD, who used it to prove the binomial theorem, Pascal's triangle, and the sum of integral cubes. The historian of mathematics, F. Woepcke, praised Al-Karaji for being "the first who introduced the theory of algebraic calculus." Also in the 10th century, Abul Wafa translated the works of Diophantus into Arabic. Ibn al-Haytham was the first mathematician to derive the formula for the sum of the fourth powers, using a method that is readily generalizable for determining the general formula for the sum of any integral powers. He performed an integration in order to find the volume of a paraboloid, and was able to generalize his result for the integrals of polynomials up to the fourth degree. He thus came close to finding a general formula for the integrals of polynomials, but he was not concerned with any polynomials higher than the fourth degree.

In the late 11th century, Omar Khayyam wrote Discussions of the Difficulties in Euclid, a book about what he perceived as flaws in Euclid's Elements, especially the parallel postulate. He was also the first to find the general geometric solution to cubic equations. He was also very influential in calendar reform.

In the 13th century, Nasir al-Din Tusi (Nasireddin) made advances in spherical trigonometry. He also wrote influential work on Euclid's parallel postulate. In the 15th century, Ghiyath al-Kashi computed the value of π to the 16th decimal place. Kashi also had an algorithm for calculating nth roots, which was a special case of the methods given many centuries later by Ruffini and Horner.

Other achievements of Muslim mathematicians during this period include the addition of the decimal point notation to the Arabic numerals, the discovery of all the modern trigonometric functions besides the sine, al-Kindi's introduction of cryptanalysis and frequency analysis, the development of analytic geometry by Ibn al-Haytham, the beginning of algebraic geometry by Omar Khayyam, and the development of an algebraic notation by al-Qalasādī.

During the time of the Ottoman Empire and Safavid Empire from the 15th century, the development of Islamic mathematics became stagnant.

== Maya ==
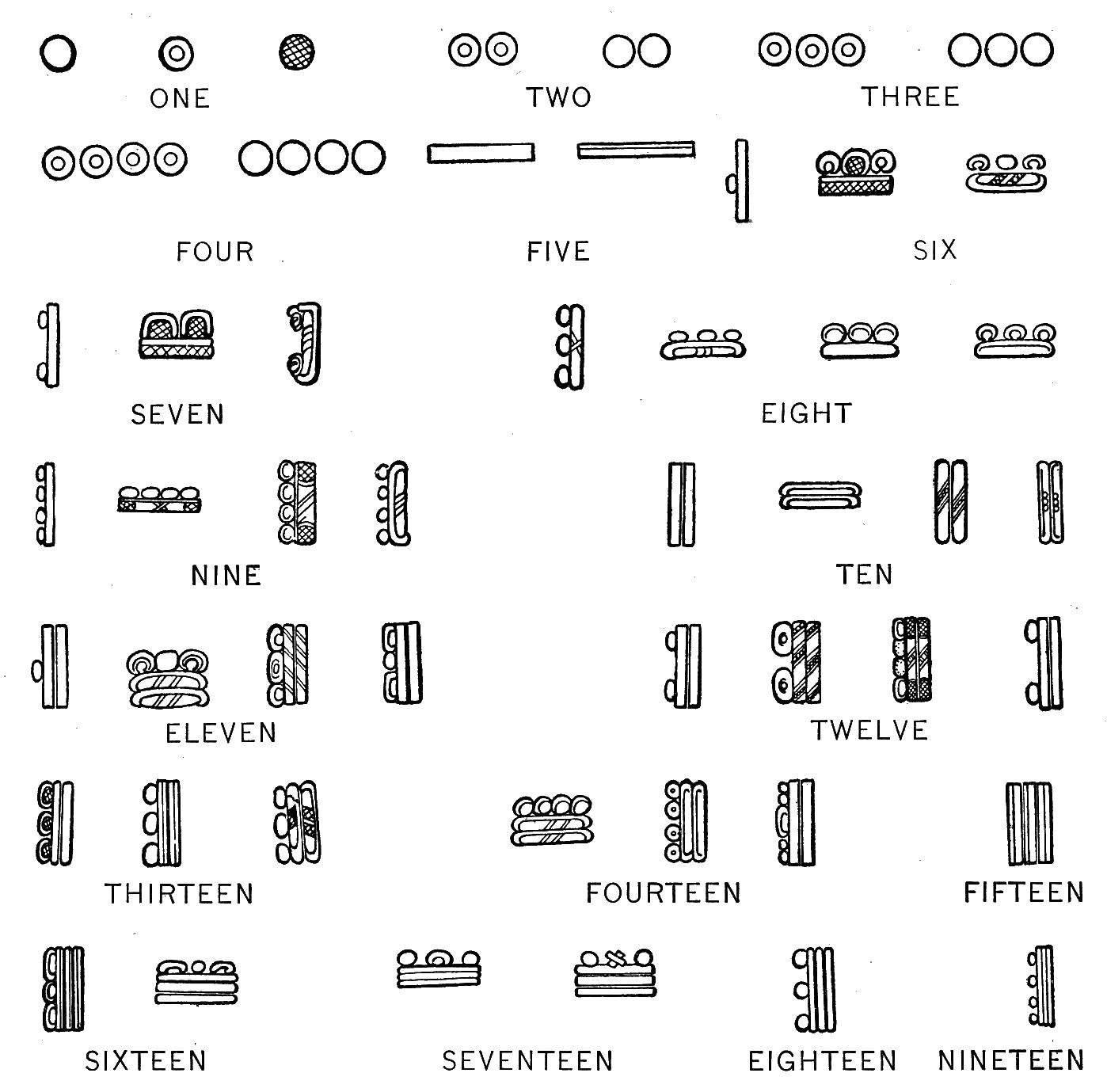
The Maya numerals for numbers 1 through 19, written in the Maya script

In the Pre-Columbian Americas, the Maya civilization that flourished in Mexico and Central America during the 1st millennium AD developed a unique tradition of mathematics that, due to its geographic isolation, was entirely independent of existing European, Egyptian, and Asian mathematics. Maya numerals used a base of twenty, the vigesimal system, instead of a base of ten that forms the basis of the decimal system used by most modern cultures. The Maya used mathematics to create the Maya calendar as well as to predict astronomical phenomena in their native Maya astronomy. While the concept of zero had to be inferred in the mathematics of many contemporary cultures, the Maya developed a standard symbol for it.

== Medieval European ==
Medieval European interest in mathematics was driven by concerns quite different from those of modern mathematicians. One driving element was the belief that mathematics provided the key to understanding the created order of nature, frequently justified by Plato's Timaeus and the biblical passage (in the Book of Wisdom) that God had ordered all things in measure, and number, and weight.

Boethius provided a place for mathematics in the curriculum in the 6th century when he coined the term quadrivium to describe the study of arithmetic, geometry, astronomy, and music. He wrote De institutione arithmetica, a free translation from the Greek of Nicomachus's Introduction to Arithmetic; De institutione musica, also derived from Greek sources; and a series of excerpts from Euclid's Elements. His works were theoretical, rather than practical, and were the basis of mathematical study until the recovery of Greek and Arabic mathematical works.

In the 12th century, European scholars traveled to Spain and Sicily seeking scientific Arabic texts, including al-Khwārizmī's The Compendious Book on Calculation by Completion and Balancing, translated into Latin by Robert of Chester, and the complete text of Euclid's Elements, translated in various versions by Adelard of Bath, Herman of Carinthia, and Gerard of Cremona. These and other new sources sparked a renewal of mathematics.

Leonardo of Pisa, now known as Fibonacci, serendipitously learned about the Hindu–Arabic numerals on a trip to what is now Béjaïa, Algeria with his merchant father. (Europe was still using Roman numerals.) There, he observed a system of arithmetic (specifically algorism) which due to the positional notation of Hindu–Arabic numerals was much more efficient and greatly facilitated commerce. Leonardo wrote Liber Abaci in 1202 (updated in 1254) introducing the technique to Europe and beginning a long period of popularizing it. The book also brought to Europe what is now known as the Fibonacci sequence (known to Indian mathematicians for hundreds of years before that) which Fibonacci used as an unremarkable example.

The 14th century saw the development of new mathematical concepts to investigate a wide range of problems. One important contribution was development of mathematics of local motion. Thomas Bradwardine proposed that speed (V) increases in arithmetic proportion as the ratio of force (F) to resistance (R) increases in geometric proportion. Bradwardine expressed this by a series of specific examples, but although the logarithm had not yet been conceived, we can express his conclusion anachronistically by writing: V = log (F/R). Bradwardine's analysis is an example of transferring a mathematical technique used by al-Kindi and Arnald of Villanova to quantify the nature of compound medicines to a different physical problem.

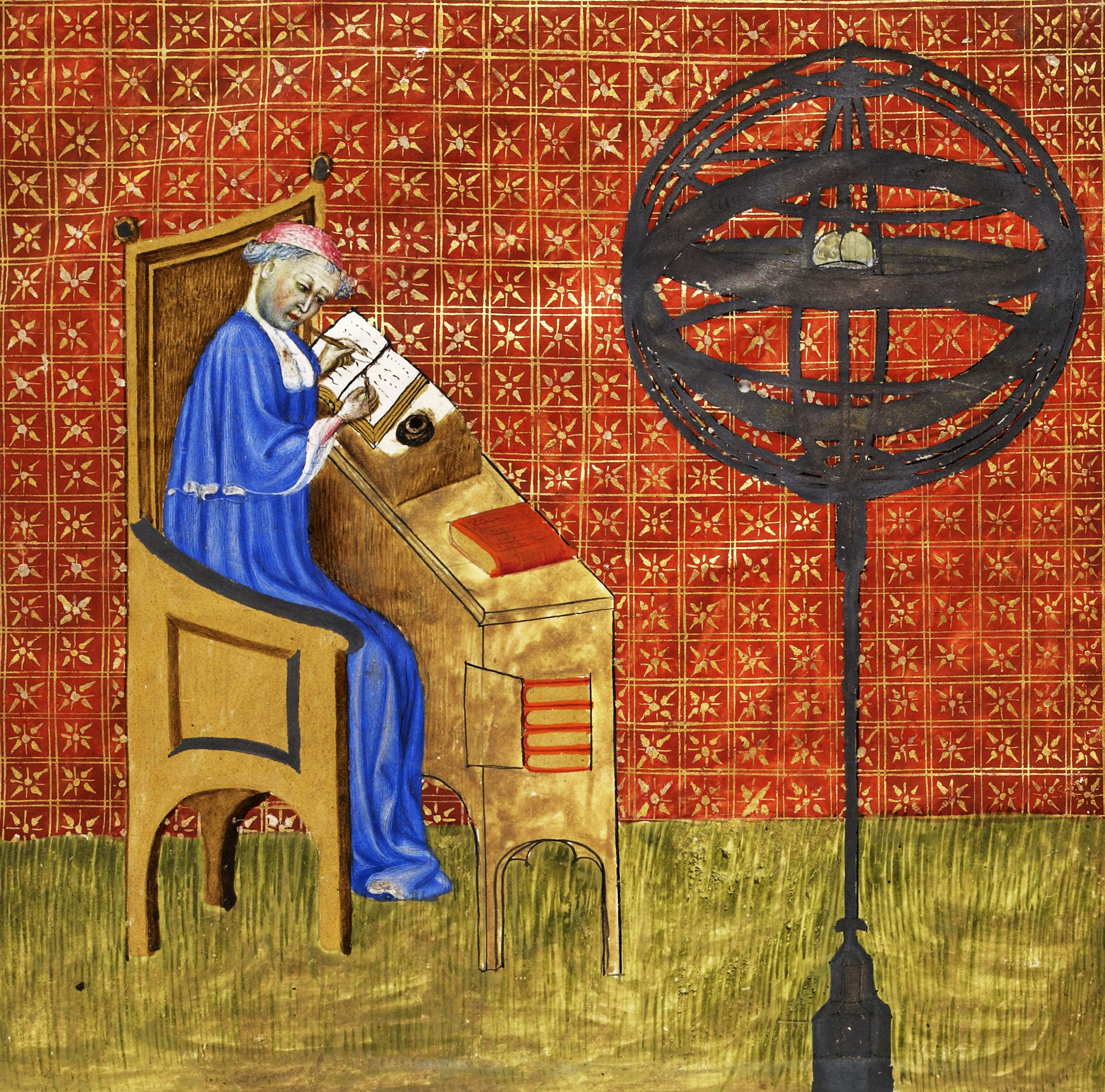
Nicole Oresme (1323–82), shown in this contemporary illuminated manuscript with an armillary sphere, was the first to offer a mathematical proof for the divergence of the harmonic series.

One of the 14th-century Oxford Calculators, William of Heytesbury, lacking differential calculus and the concept of limits, proposed to measure instantaneous speed "by the path that would be described by [a body] if... it were moved uniformly at the same degree of speed with which it is moved in that given instant".

Heytesbury and others mathematically determined the distance covered by a body undergoing uniformly accelerated motion (today solved by integration), stating that "a moving body uniformly acquiring or losing that increment [of speed] will traverse in some given time a [distance] completely equal to that which it would traverse if it were moving continuously through the same time with the mean degree [of speed]".

Nicole Oresme at the University of Paris and the Italian Giovanni di Casali independently provided graphical demonstrations of this relationship, asserting that the area under the line depicting the constant acceleration, represented the total distance traveled. In a later mathematical commentary on Euclid's Elements, Oresme made a more detailed general analysis in which he demonstrated that a body will acquire in each successive increment of time an increment of any quality that increases as the odd numbers. Since Euclid had demonstrated the sum of the odd numbers are the square numbers, the total quality acquired by the body increases as the square of the time.

== Renaissance ==
During the Renaissance, the development of mathematics and of accounting were intertwined. While there is no direct relationship between algebra and accounting, the teaching of the subjects and the books published often intended for the children of merchants who were sent to reckoning schools (in Flanders and Germany) or abacus schools (known as abbaco in Italy), where they learned the skills useful for trade and commerce. There is probably no need for algebra in performing bookkeeping operations, but for complex bartering operations or the calculation of compound interest, a basic knowledge of arithmetic was mandatory and knowledge of algebra was very useful.

Piero della Francesca (c. 1415 – c. 1492) wrote books on solid geometry and linear perspective, including De Prospectiva Pingendi (On Perspective for Painting), Trattato d'Abaco (Abacus Treatise), and De quinque corporibus regularibus (On the Five Regular Solids).

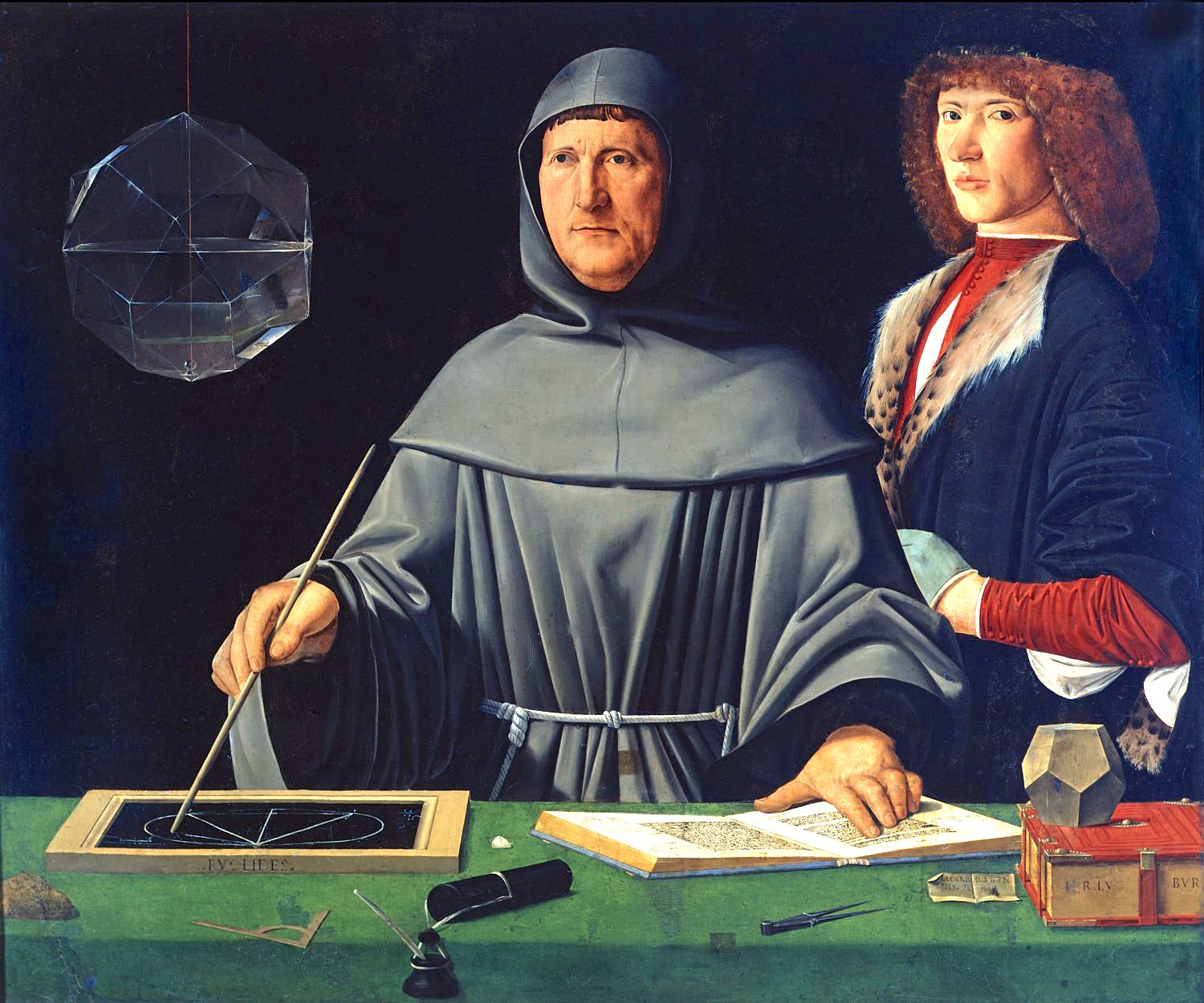
Portrait of Luca Pacioli, a painting traditionally attributed to Jacopo de' Barbari, 1495 (Museo di Capodimonte)

Luca Pacioli's Summa de Arithmetica, Geometria, Proportioni et Proportionalità (Italian: "Review of Arithmetic, Geometry, Ratio and Proportion") was first printed and published in Venice in 1494. It included a 27-page treatise on bookkeeping, "Particularis de Computis et Scripturis" (Italian: "Details of Calculation and Recording"). It was written primarily for, and sold mainly to, merchants who used the book as a reference text, as a source of pleasure from the mathematical puzzles it contained, and to aid the education of their sons. In Summa Arithmetica, Pacioli introduced symbols for plus and minus for the first time in a printed book, symbols that became standard notation in Italian Renaissance mathematics. Summa Arithmetica was also the first known book printed in Italy to contain algebra. Pacioli obtained many of his ideas from Piero Della Francesca whom he plagiarized.

In Italy, during the first half of the 16th century, Scipione del Ferro and Niccolò Fontana Tartaglia discovered solutions for cubic equations. Gerolamo Cardano published them in his 1545 book Ars Magna, together with a solution for the quartic equations, discovered by his student Lodovico Ferrari. In 1572 Rafael Bombelli published his L'Algebra in which he showed how to deal with the imaginary quantities that could appear in Cardano's formula for solving cubic equations.

Simon Stevin's De Thiende ('the art of tenths'), first published in Dutch in 1585, contained the first systematic treatment of decimal notation in Europe, which influenced all later work on the real number system.

Driven by the demands of navigation and the growing need for accurate maps of large areas, trigonometry grew to be a major branch of mathematics. Bartholomaeus Pitiscus was the first to use the word, publishing his Trigonometria in 1595. Regiomontanus's table of sines and cosines was published in 1533.

During the Renaissance the desire of artists to represent the natural world realistically, together with the rediscovered philosophy of the Greeks, led artists to study mathematics. They were also the engineers and architects of that time, and so had need of mathematics in any case. The art of painting in perspective, and the developments in geometry that were involved, were studied intensely.

== Mathematics during the Scientific Revolution ==
=== 16th century ===
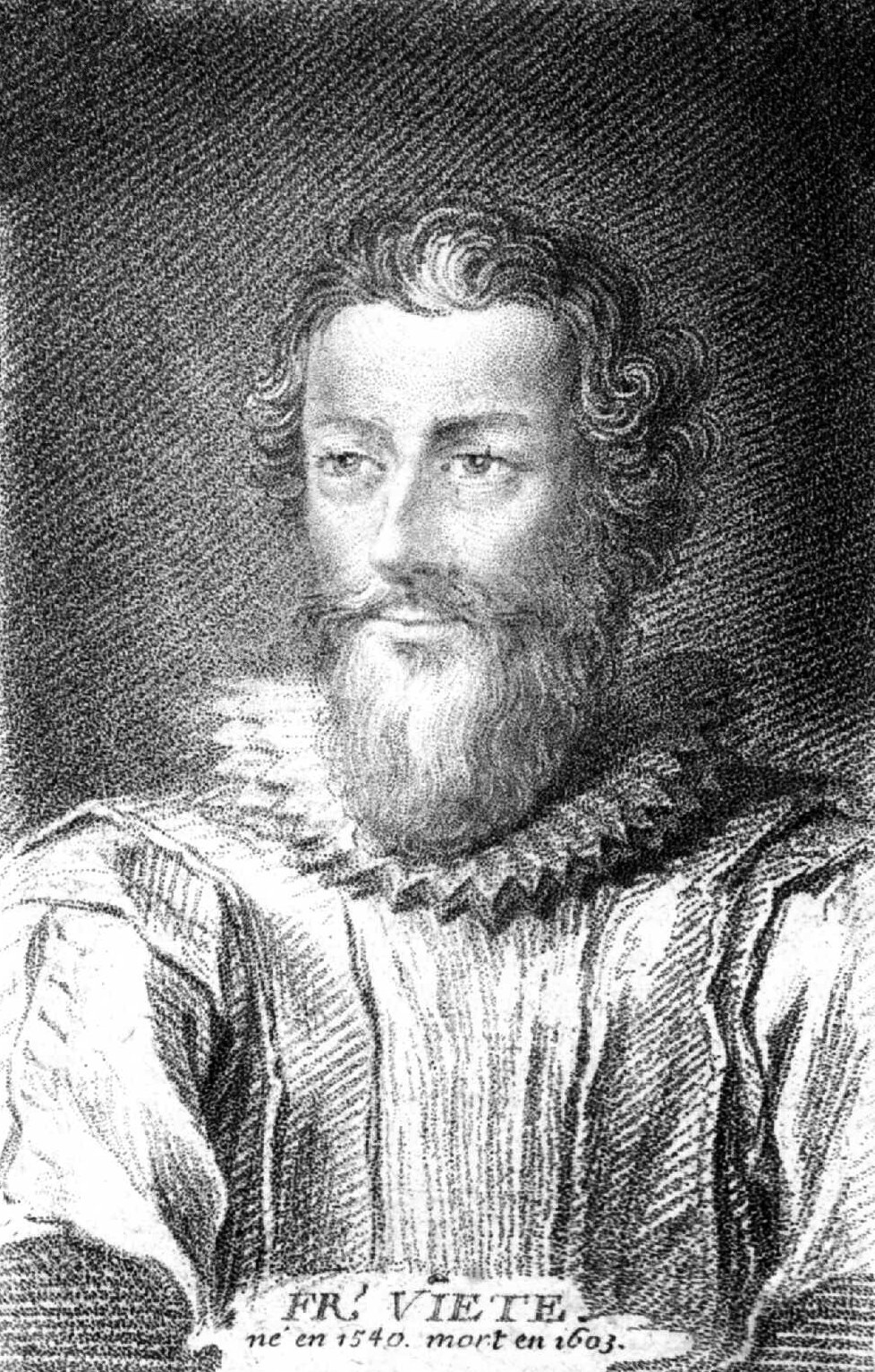
François Viète

The later 16th century saw important steps toward the more systematic and symbolic mathematics that would characterize the Scientific Revolution. The most influential figure in this development was the French mathematician François Viète (1540–1603). In his In artem analyticem isagoge (Introduction to the Analytical Art, 1591), Viète introduced a systematic use of letters to represent both unknown and known quantities, using vowels for the unknowns and consonants for the parameters. This marked a shift from the earlier rhetorical and cossist styles of algebra toward a more general algebraic method that treated equations as relations among magnitudes rather than as numerical problems to be solved case by case. Viète’s approach influenced the algebraic thinking of both Descartes and Fermat in the following century.

Viète also contributed significantly to trigonometry. His Canon mathematicus seu ad triangula (1579) presented a systematic treatment of the six trigonometric functions and supplied extensive tables. These tables, and his later work relating trigonometric identities to the solution of cubic equations, were directly useful for astronomical calculation. In 1593 he published what is believed to be the first infinite product representation of π, derived from trigonometric considerations.

The same period saw the publication of the most consequential mathematical reformulation of the cosmos of the century. Nicolaus Copernicus’s De revolutionibus orbium coelestium (1543) offered a heliocentric model whose primary content was mathematical rather than physical. The improved trigonometric tables associated with Copernicus’s circle (especially those prepared by Georg Joachim Rheticus) supported the more precise calculation of planetary positions that later enabled Kepler’s work. By the end of the century, the algebraic tools developed earlier in the Renaissance and the expanding apparatus of trigonometry were increasingly being applied to the quantitative study of nature, setting the stage for the developments of the 17th century.

=== 17th century ===
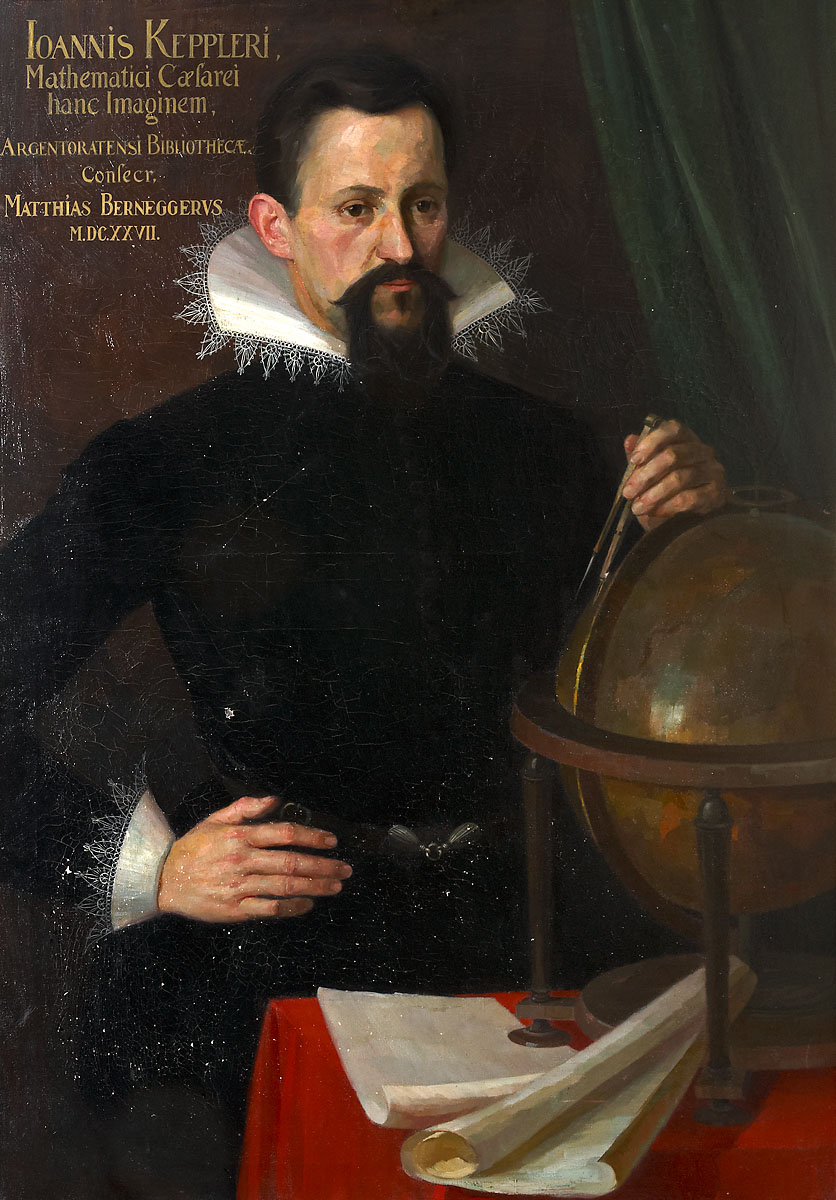
Johannes Kepler

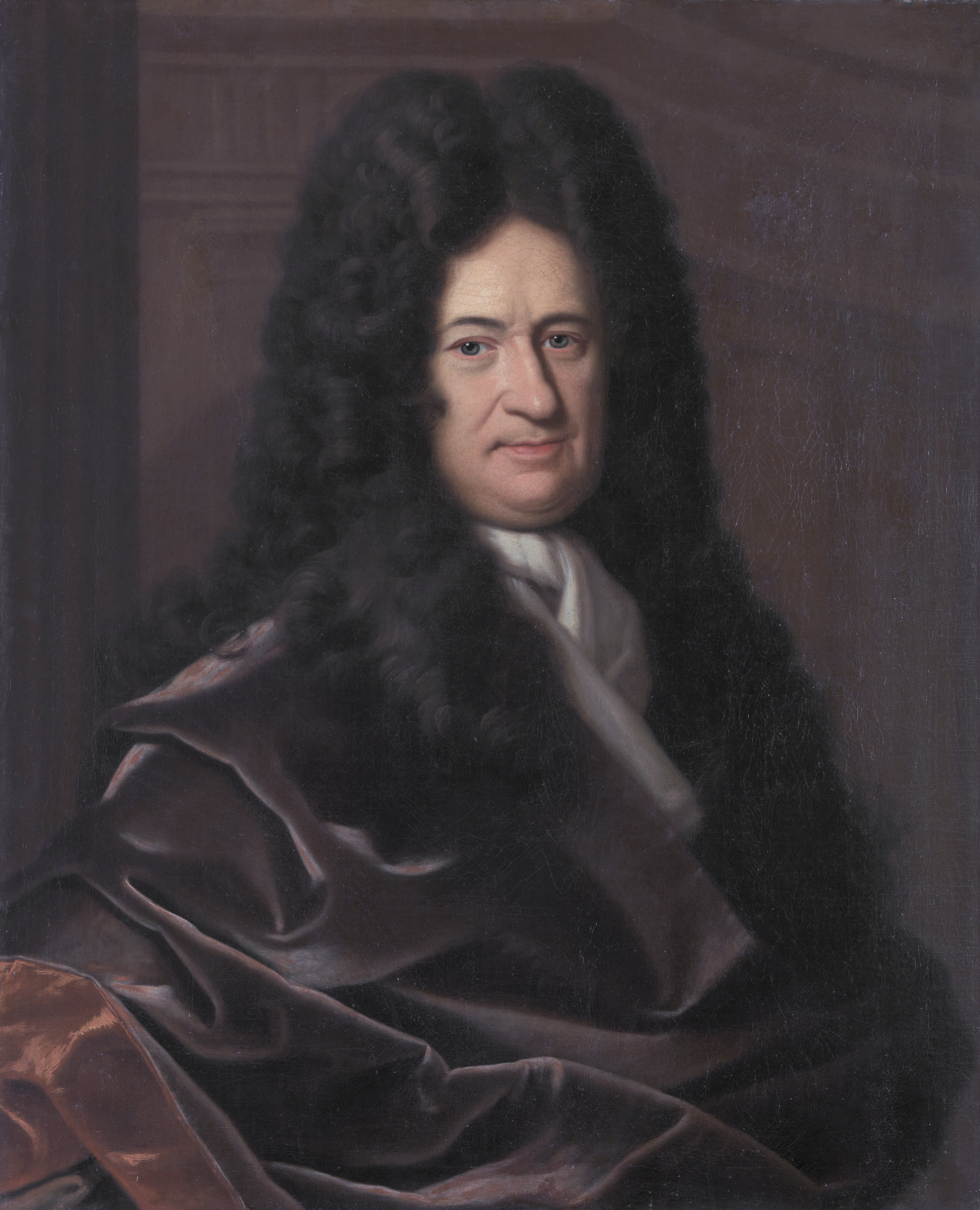
Gottfried Wilhelm Leibniz

The 17th century saw an unprecedented increase of mathematical and scientific ideas across Europe. Tycho Brahe had gathered a large quantity of mathematical data describing the positions of the planets in the sky. By his position as Brahe's assistant, Johannes Kepler was first exposed to and seriously interacted with the topic of planetary motion. Kepler's calculations were made simpler by the contemporaneous invention of logarithms by John Napier and Jost Bürgi. Kepler succeeded in formulating mathematical laws of planetary motion. The analytic geometry developed by René Descartes (1596–1650) allowed those orbits to be plotted on a graph, in Cartesian coordinates.

Building on earlier work by many predecessors, Isaac Newton discovered the laws of physics that explain Kepler's Laws, and brought together the concepts now known as calculus. Independently, Gottfried Wilhelm Leibniz, developed calculus and much of the calculus notation still in use today. He also refined the binary number system, which is the foundation of nearly all digital (electronic, solid-state, discrete logic) computers.

Science and mathematics had become an international endeavor, which would soon spread over the entire world.

In addition to the application of mathematics to the studies of the heavens, applied mathematics began to expand into new areas, with the correspondence of Pierre de Fermat and Blaise Pascal. Pascal and Fermat set the groundwork for the investigations of probability theory and the corresponding rules of combinatorics in their discussions over a game of gambling. Pascal, with his wager, attempted to use the newly developing probability theory to argue for a life devoted to religion, on the grounds that even if the probability of success was small, the rewards were infinite. In some sense, this foreshadowed the development of utility theory in the 18th and 19th centuries.

=== 18th century ===
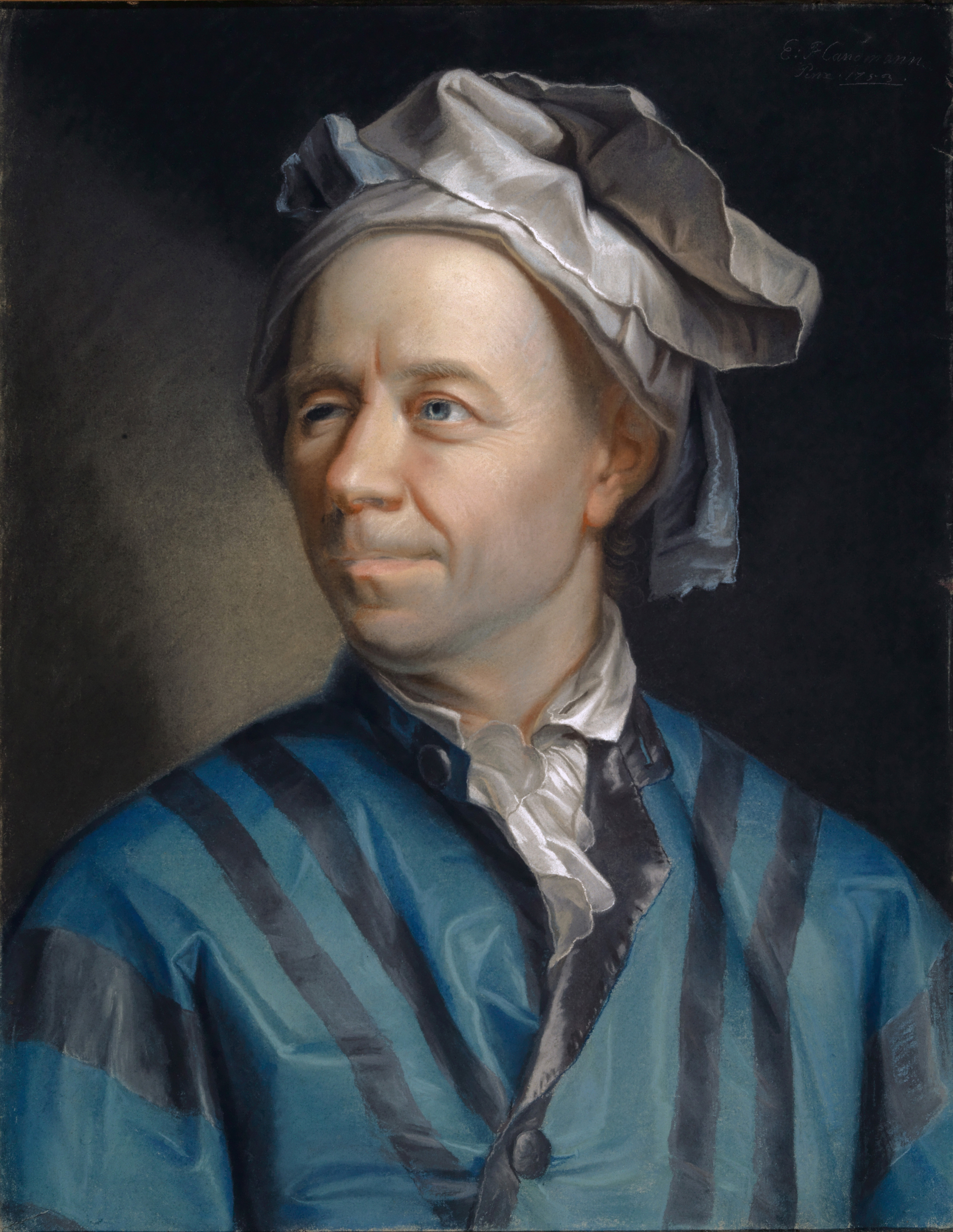
Leonhard Euler

The most influential mathematician of the 18th century was arguably Leonhard Euler (1707–83). His contributions range from founding the study of graph theory with the Seven Bridges of Königsberg problem to standardizing many modern mathematical terms and notations. For example, he named the square root of minus 1 with the symbol i, and he popularized the use of the Greek letter $\pi$ to stand for the ratio of a circle's circumference to its diameter. He made numerous contributions to the study of topology, graph theory, calculus, combinatorics, and complex analysis, as evidenced by the multitude of theorems and notations named for him.

Other important European mathematicians of the 18th century included Joseph Louis Lagrange, who did pioneering work in number theory, algebra, differential calculus, and the calculus of variations, and Pierre-Simon Laplace, who, in the age of Napoleon, did important work on the foundations of celestial mechanics and on statistics.

== Modern ==
=== 19th century ===
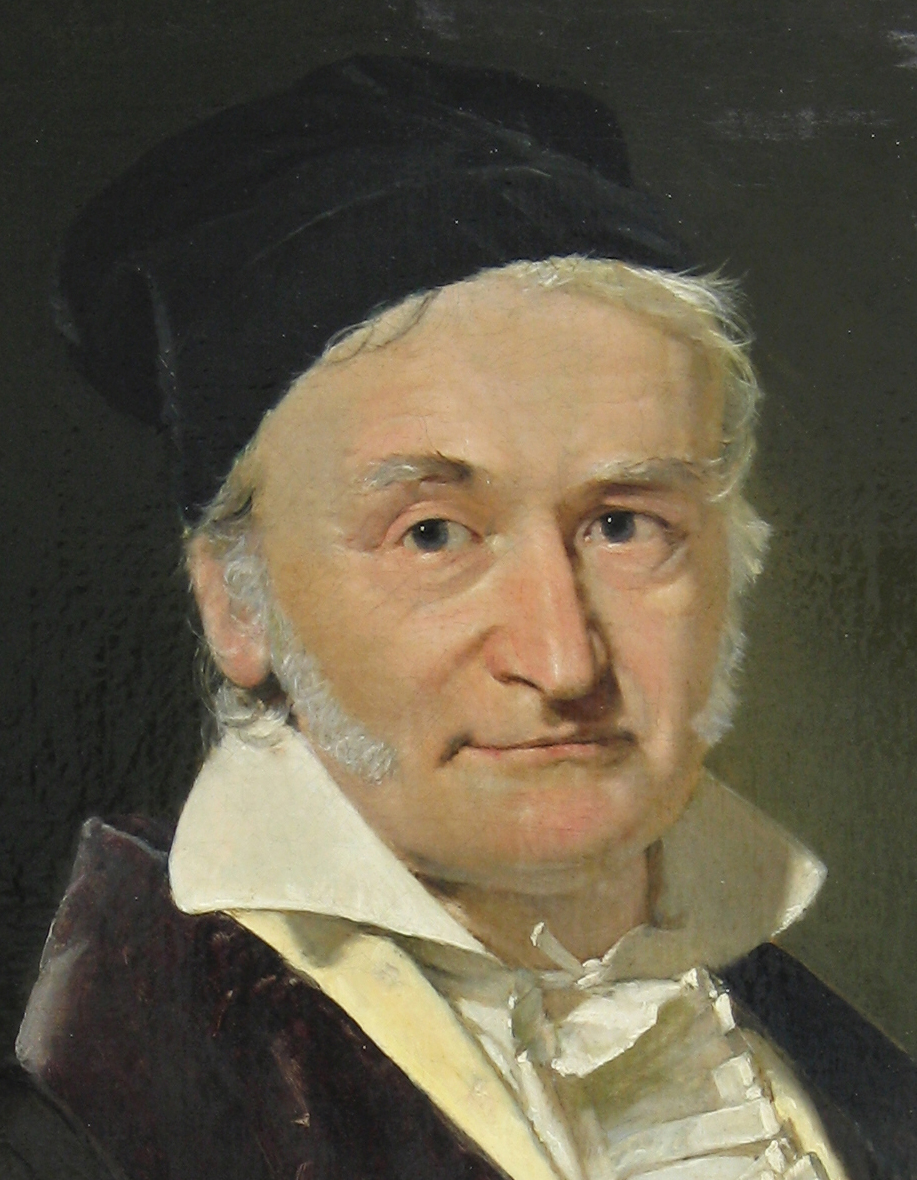
Carl Friedrich Gauss

Throughout the 19th century mathematics became increasingly abstract. Carl Friedrich Gauss (1777–1855) did revolutionary work on functions of complex variables, in geometry, and on the convergence of series, leaving aside his many contributions to science. He also gave the first satisfactory proofs of the fundamental theorem of algebra and quadratic reciprocity law.

Behavior of lines with a common perpendicular in each of the three types of geometry

This century saw the development of the two forms of non-Euclidean geometry, where the parallel postulate of Euclidean geometry no longer holds. The Russian mathematician Nikolai Ivanovich Lobachevsky and his rival, the Hungarian mathematician János Bolyai, independently defined and studied hyperbolic geometry, where uniqueness of parallels no longer holds. In this geometry the sum of angles in a triangle add up to less than 180°. Elliptic geometry was developed later in the 19th century by the German mathematician Bernhard Riemann; here no parallel can be found and the angles in a triangle add up to more than 180°. Riemann also developed Riemannian geometry, which unifies and vastly generalizes the three types of geometry, and he defined the concept of a manifold, which generalizes the ideas of curves and surfaces, and set the mathematical foundations for the theory of general relativity.

The 19th century saw the beginning of a great deal of abstract algebra. Hermann Grassmann in Germany gave a first version of vector spaces, William Rowan Hamilton in Ireland developed noncommutative algebra. The British mathematician George Boole devised an algebra that soon evolved into what is now called Boolean algebra, in which the only numbers were 0 and 1. Boolean algebra is the starting point of mathematical logic and has important applications in electrical engineering and computer science. Augustin-Louis Cauchy, Bernhard Riemann, and Karl Weierstrass reformulated the calculus in a more rigorous fashion.

Also, for the first time, the limits of mathematics were explored. Paolo Ruffini, Niels Henrik Abel, and Évariste Galois proved there is no general algebraic method for solving polynomial equations of degree greater than four (Abel–Ruffini theorem). Other 19th-century mathematicians used this in their proofs that straight edge and compass alone are not sufficient to trisect an arbitrary angle, to construct the side of a cube twice the volume of a given cube, nor to construct a square equal in area to a given circle. Mathematicians had vainly attempted to solve these problems since the ancient Greeks. On the other hand, the limitation of three dimensions in geometry was surpassed in the 19th century through considerations of parameter space and hypercomplex numbers.

Abel and Galois's investigations into the solutions of various polynomial equations laid the groundwork for further developments of group theory, and the associated fields of abstract algebra. In the 20th century physicists and other scientists have seen group theory as the ideal way to study symmetry.

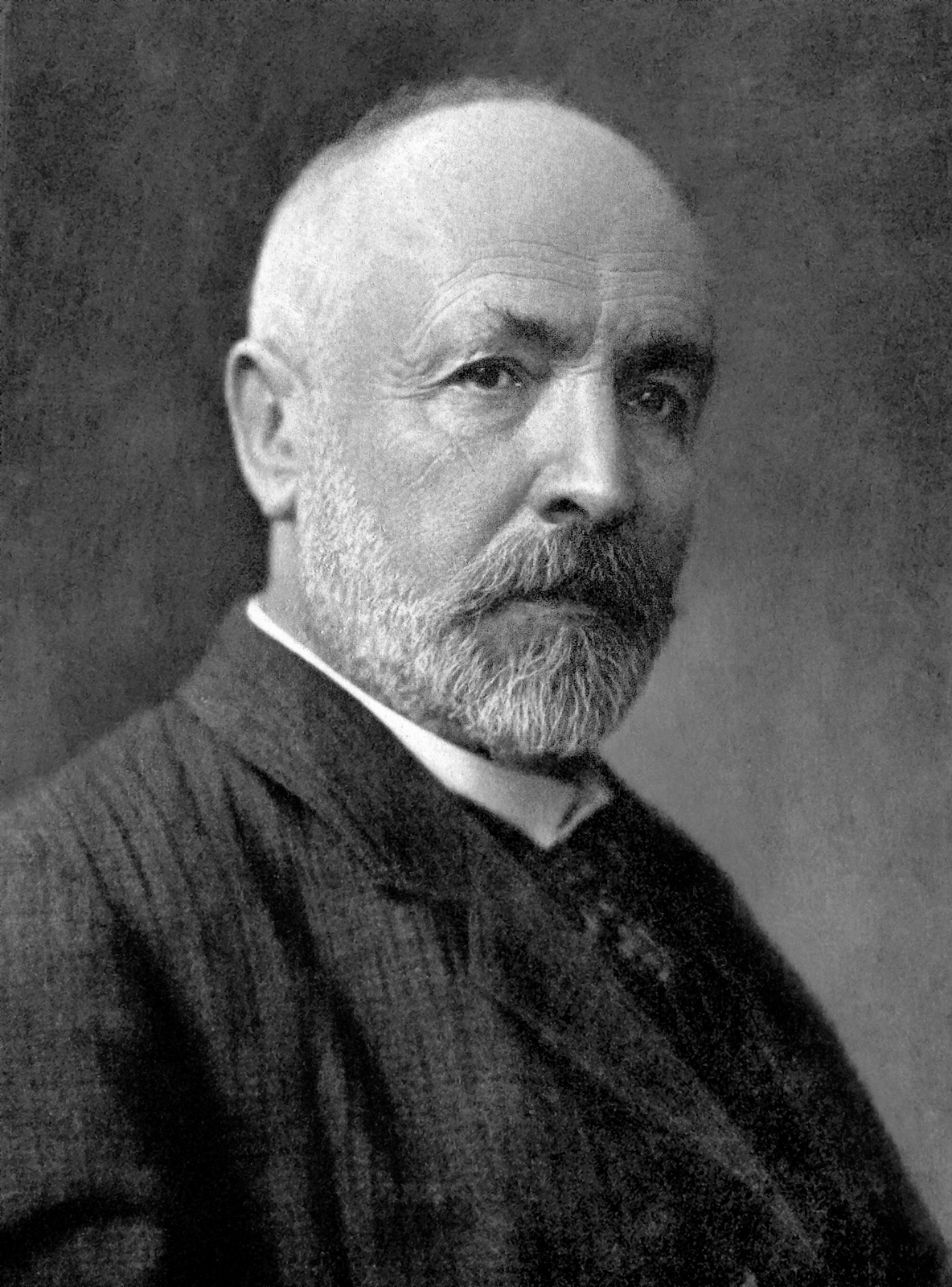
Georg Cantor

In the later 19th century, Georg Cantor established the first foundations of set theory, which enabled the rigorous treatment of the notion of infinity and has become the common language of nearly all mathematics. Cantor's set theory, and the rise of mathematical logic in the hands of Peano, L.E.J. Brouwer, David Hilbert, Bertrand Russell, and A.N. Whitehead, initiated a long running debate on the foundations of mathematics.

The 19th century saw the founding of a number of national mathematical societies: the London Mathematical Society in 1865, the Société mathématique de France in 1872, the Circolo Matematico di Palermo in 1884, the Edinburgh Mathematical Society in 1883, and the American Mathematical Society in 1888. The first international, special-interest society, the Quaternion Association, was formed in 1899, in the context of a vector controversy. In 1897, Kurt Hensel introduced p-adic numbers.

=== 20th century ===
The 20th century saw mathematics become a major profession. By the end of the century, thousands of new Ph.D.s in mathematics were being awarded every year, and jobs were available in both teaching and industry. An effort to catalogue the areas and applications of mathematics was undertaken in Klein's encyclopedia.

In a 1900 speech to the International Congress of Mathematicians, David Hilbert set out a list of 23 unsolved problems in mathematics. These problems, spanning many areas of mathematics, formed a central focus for much of 20th-century mathematics. 10 have been solved, 7 partially solved, and 2 are still open. The remaining 4 are too loosely formulated to be stated as solved or not.

A map illustrating the Four Color Theorem

Notable historical conjectures were finally proven. In 1976, Wolfgang Haken and Kenneth Appel proved the four color theorem, controversial at the time for the use of a computer to do so. Andrew Wiles, building on the work of others, proved Fermat's Last Theorem in 1995. Paul Cohen and Kurt Gödel proved that the continuum hypothesis is independent of (could neither be proved nor disproved from) the standard axioms of set theory. In 1998, Thomas Callister Hales proved the Kepler conjecture, also using a computer.

Mathematical collaborations of unprecedented size and scope took place. An example is the classification of finite simple groups (also called the "enormous theorem"), whose proof between 1955 and 2004 required 500-odd journal articles by about 100 authors, and filling tens of thousands of pages. A group of French mathematicians, including Jean Dieudonné and André Weil, publishing under the pseudonym "Nicolas Bourbaki", attempted to exposit all of known mathematics as a coherent rigorous whole. The resulting several dozen volumes has had a controversial influence on mathematical education.

Newtonian (red) vs. Einsteinian orbit (blue) of a lone planet orbiting a star, with relativistic precession of apsides

Differential geometry came into its own when Albert Einstein used it in general relativity. Entirely new areas of mathematics such as mathematical logic, topology, and John von Neumann's game theory changed the kinds of questions that could be answered by mathematical methods. All kinds of structures were abstracted using axioms and given names like metric spaces, topological spaces etc. The concept of an abstract structure was itself abstracted and led to category theory. Grothendieck and Serre recast algebraic geometry using sheaf theory. Large advances were made in the qualitative study of dynamical systems that Poincaré had begun in the 1890s. Measure theory was developed in the late 19th and early 20th centuries. Applications of measures include the Lebesgue integral, Kolmogorov's axiomatisation of probability theory, and ergodic theory. Knot theory greatly expanded. Quantum mechanics aided the development of functional analysis, a branch of mathematics developed by Stefan Banach and his collaborators who formed the Lwów School of Mathematics. Other new areas include Laurent Schwartz's distribution theory, fixed point theory, singularity theory and René Thom's catastrophe theory, model theory, and Mandelbrot's fractals. Lie theory with its Lie groups and Lie algebras became one of the major areas of study.

Nonstandard analysis, introduced by Abraham Robinson, rehabilitated the infinitesimal approach to calculus, which had fallen into disrepute in favour of the theory of limits, by extending the field of real numbers to the Hyperreal numbers which include infinitesimal and infinite quantities. An even larger number system, the surreal numbers were discovered by John Horton Conway in connection with combinatorial games.

The development and continual improvement of computers, at first mechanical analog machines and then digital electronic machines, allowed industry to deal with larger and larger amounts of data to facilitate mass production and distribution and communication, and new areas of mathematics were developed to deal with this: Alan Turing's computability theory; complexity theory; Derrick Henry Lehmer's use of ENIAC to further number theory and the Lucas–Lehmer primality test; Rózsa Péter's recursive function theory; Claude Shannon's information theory; signal processing; data analysis; optimization and other areas of operations research. In the preceding centuries much mathematical focus was on calculus and continuous functions, but the rise of computing and communication networks led to an increasing importance of discrete concepts and the expansion of combinatorics including graph theory. The speed and data processing abilities of computers also enabled the handling of mathematical problems that were too time-consuming to deal with by pencil and paper calculations, leading to areas such as numerical analysis and computer algebra. Some of the most important methods and algorithms of the 20th century are: the simplex algorithm, the fast Fourier transform, error-correcting codes, the Kalman filter from control theory and the RSA algorithm of public-key cryptography.

At the same time, deep insights were made about the limitations to mathematics. In 1929 and 1930, it was proved by Mojżesz Presburger, that the truth or falsity of all statements formulated about the natural numbers plus either addition or multiplication (but not both), was decidable, i.e. could be determined by some algorithm. In 1931, Kurt Gödel found that this was not the case for the natural numbers plus both addition and multiplication; this system, known as Peano arithmetic, was in fact incomplete. (Peano arithmetic is adequate for a good deal of number theory, including the notion of prime number.) A consequence of Gödel's two incompleteness theorems is that in any mathematical system that includes Peano arithmetic (including all of analysis and geometry), truth necessarily outruns proof, i.e. there are true statements that cannot be proved within the system. Hence mathematics cannot be reduced to mathematical logic, and David Hilbert's dream of making all of mathematics complete and consistent needed to be reformulated.

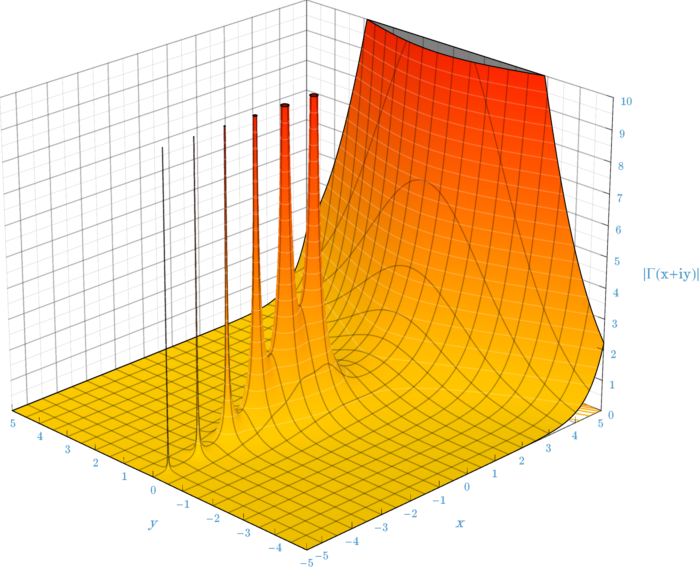
The absolute value of the Gamma function on the complex plane

One of the more colorful figures in 20th-century mathematics was Srinivasa Ramanujan (1887–1920), an Indian autodidact who conjectured or proved over 3000 theorems, including properties of highly composite numbers, the partition function and its asymptotics, and mock theta functions. He also made major investigations in the areas of gamma functions, modular forms, divergent series, hypergeometric series and prime number theory.

Paul Erdős published more papers than any other mathematician in history, working with hundreds of collaborators. Mathematicians have a game equivalent to the Kevin Bacon Game, which leads to the Erdős number of a mathematician. This describes the "collaborative distance" between a person and Erdős, as measured by joint authorship of mathematical papers.

Emmy Noether has been described by many as the most important woman in the history of mathematics. She studied the theories of rings, fields, and algebras.

As in most areas of study, the explosion of knowledge in the scientific age has led to specialization: by the end of the century, there were hundreds of specialized areas in mathematics, and the Mathematics Subject Classification was dozens of pages long. More and more mathematical journals were published and, by the end of the century, the development of the World Wide Web led to online publishing.

=== 21st century ===
In 2000, the Clay Mathematics Institute announced the seven Millennium Prize Problems. In 2003 the Poincaré conjecture was solved by Grigori Perelman (who declined to accept an award, as he was critical of the mathematics establishment).

Most mathematical journals now have online versions as well as print versions, and many online-only journals are launched. There is an increasing drive toward open access publishing, first made popular by arXiv.

Many other important problems have been solved in this century. Examples include the Green–Tao theorem (2004), existence of bounded gaps between arbitrarily large primes (2013), and the modularity theorem (2001). The AKS primality test was published in 2002, which is the first algorithm that can determine whether a number is prime or composite in polynomial time. A proof of Goldbach's weak conjecture was published by Harald Helfgott in 2013; as of 2025, the proof has not yet been fully reviewed. The first einstein was discovered in 2023.

In addition, a lot of work has been done toward long-lasting projects which began in the twentieth century. For example, the classification of finite simple groups was completed in 2008. Similarly, work on the Langlands program has progressed significantly, and there have been proofs of the fundamental lemma (2008), as well as a proposed proof of the geometric Langlands correspondence in 2024.

== Future ==
The future trajectory of mathematics is anticipated to be significantly influenced by the integration of advanced computational methodologies, though the exact epistemological consequences remain a subject of ongoing academic debate. The utilization of artificial intelligence (AI) and automated theorem provers, such as Rocq and Lean, is increasingly prominent in the formal verification of complex theorems. While proponents suggest this integration may enhance logical rigor, some scholars argue it could potentially obscure fundamental human comprehension if proofs become too computationally dense for independent human verification. Furthermore, the application of machine learning algorithms to identify heuristic patterns in fields like knot theory is hypothesized to accelerate mathematical discovery; however, the reliance on algorithmic processes necessitates cautious epistemological scrutiny regarding verifiability.

In the realm of applied mathematics, the theoretical development of quantum computing is widely projected to necessitate a paradigm shift in cryptography. Algorithms such as Shor's algorithm possess the theoretical capacity to efficiently factorize large prime numbers, which would ostensibly compromise widely used public-key cryptosystems like RSA. Consequently, researchers are actively developing post-quantum cryptography, an area heavily reliant on algebraic geometry and lattice-based structures. Nevertheless, the timeline for the practical engineering of scalable, fault-tolerant quantum computers remains highly uncertain, making the immediate urgency of this cryptographic transition a topic of theoretical speculation.

Additionally, the expanding availability of massive empirical datasets, commonly termed Big data, has stimulated the development of topological data analysis (TDA). This interdisciplinary field attempts to apply abstract geometric and topological concepts to identify structural features in noisy, high-dimensional data. Despite its potential, the application of deterministic mathematical models to inherently stochastic biological or sociological systems must be approached with critical caution to avoid conflating statistical anomalies with actual causal mechanisms.

== See also ==
- Archives of American Mathematics
- Ethnomathematics
- History of algebra
- History of arithmetic
- History of calculus
- History of combinatorics
- History of the function concept
- History of geometry
- History of group theory
- History of logic
- History of mathematicians
- History of mathematical notation
- History of measurement
- History of numbers
  - History of ancient numeral systems
  - Prehistoric counting
  - List of books on history of number systems
- History of statistics
- History of trigonometry
- History of writing numbers
- Kenneth O. May Prize
- List of important publications in mathematics
- Lists of mathematicians
- List of mathematics history topics
- Mathematical folklore
- Timeline of mathematics
