= List of mathematics history topics =

This is a list of mathematics history topics, by Wikipedia page. See also list of mathematicians, timeline of mathematics, history of mathematics, list of publications in mathematics.

- 1729 (anecdote)
- Adequality
- Archimedes Palimpsest
- Archimedes' use of infinitesimals
- Arithmetization of analysis
- Brachistochrone curve
- Chinese mathematics
- Cours d'Analyse
- Edinburgh Mathematical Society
- Erlangen programme
- Fermat's Last Theorem
- Greek mathematics
- Thomas Little Heath
- Hilbert's problems
- History of topos theory
- Hyperbolic quaternion
- Indian mathematics
- Islamic mathematics
- Italian school of algebraic geometry
- Kraków School of Mathematics
- Law of Continuity
- Lwów School of Mathematics
- Nicolas Bourbaki
- Non-Euclidean geometry
- Scottish Café
- Seven bridges of Königsberg
- Spectral theory
- Synthetic geometry
- Tautochrone curve
- Unifying theories in mathematics
- Waring's problem
- Warsaw School of Mathematics

== Academic positions ==
- Lowndean Professor of Astronomy and Geometry
- Lucasian professor
- Rouse Ball Professor of Mathematics
- Sadleirian Chair
