= Sterbenz lemma =

Exact floating-point subtraction theorem

In floating-point arithmetic, the Sterbenz lemma or Sterbenz's lemma is a theorem giving conditions under which floating-point differences are computed exactly. It is named after Pat Holmes Sterbenz, who published a variant of it in 1974.

Sterbenz lemma—In a floating-point number system with subnormal numbers, if $x$ and $y$ are floating-point numbers such that

$$\frac{y}{2} \leq x \leq 2 y,$$

then $x - y$ is also a floating-point number. Thus, a correctly rounded floating-point subtraction

$$x \ominus y = \operatorname{fl}(x - y) = x - y$$

is computed exactly.

The Sterbenz lemma applies to IEEE 754, the most widely used floating-point number system in computers.

== Proof ==
Let $\beta$ be the radix of the floating-point system and $p$ the precision.

Consider several easy cases first:

- If $x$ is zero then $x - y = -y$, and if $y$ is zero then $x - y = x$, so the result is trivial because floating-point negation is always exact.
- If $x = y$ the result is zero and thus exact.
- If $x < 0$ then we must also have $y/2 \leq x < 0$ so $y < 0$. In this case, $x - y = -(-x - -y)$, so the result follows from the theorem restricted to $x, y \geq 0$.
- If $x \leq y$, we can write $x - y = -(y - x)$ with $x/2 \leq y \leq 2 x$, so the result follows from the theorem restricted to $x \geq y$.

For the rest of the proof, assume $0 < y < x \leq 2 y$ without loss of generality.

Write $x, y > 0$ in terms of their positive integral significands $s_x, s_y \leq \beta^p - 1$ and minimal exponents $e_x, e_y$:

$$\begin{align}
x &= s_x \cdot \beta^{e_x - p + 1} \\
y &= s_y \cdot \beta^{e_y - p + 1}
\end{align}$$

Note that $x$ and $y$ may be subnormal—we do not assume $s_x, s_y \geq \beta^{p - 1}$.

The subtraction gives:

$$\begin{align}
x - y
&= s_x \cdot \beta^{e_x - p + 1}
- s_y \cdot \beta^{e_y - p + 1} \\
&= s_x \beta^{e_x - e_y} \cdot \beta^{e_y - p + 1}
- s_y \cdot \beta^{e_y - p + 1} \\
&= (s_x \beta^{e_x - e_y} - s_y) \cdot \beta^{e_y - p + 1}.
\end{align}$$

Let $s' = s_x \beta^{e_x - e_y} - s_y$. Since $0 < y < x$ we have:

- $e_y \leq e_x$, so $e_x - e_y \geq 0$, from which we can conclude $\beta^{e_x - e_y}$ is an integer and therefore so is $s' = s_x \beta^{e_x - e_y} - s_y$; and
- $x - y > 0$, so $s' > 0$.

Further, since $x \leq 2 y$, we have $x - y \leq y$, so that

$$s' \cdot \beta^{e_y - p + 1} = x - y \leq y = s_y \cdot \beta^{e_y - p + 1}$$

which implies that

$$0 < s' \leq s_y \leq \beta^p - 1.$$

Hence

$$x - y = s' \cdot \beta^{e_y - p + 1},
\quad \text{for} \quad
0 < s' \leq \beta^p - 1,$$

so $x - y$ is a floating-point number. ∎

Note: Even if $x$ and $y$ are normal, i.e., $s_x, s_y \geq \beta^{p - 1}$, we cannot prove that $s' \geq \beta^{p - 1}$ and therefore cannot prove that $x - y$ is also normal. For example, the difference of the two smallest positive normal floating-point numbers $x = (\beta^{p - 1} + 1) \cdot \beta^{e_{\mathrm{min}} - p + 1}$ and $y = \beta^{p - 1} \cdot \beta^{e_{\mathrm{min}} - p + 1}$ is $x - y = 1 \cdot \beta^{e_{\mathrm{min}} - p + 1}$ which is necessarily subnormal. In floating-point number systems without subnormal numbers, such as CPUs in nonstandard flush-to-zero mode instead of the standard gradual underflow, the Sterbenz lemma does not apply.

== Relation to catastrophic cancellation ==
The Sterbenz lemma may be contrasted with the phenomenon of catastrophic cancellation:

- The Sterbenz lemma asserts that if $x$ and $y$ are sufficiently close floating-point numbers then their difference $x - y$ is computed exactly by floating-point arithmetic $x \ominus y = \operatorname{fl}(x - y)$, with no rounding needed.
- The phenomenon of catastrophic cancellation is that if $\tilde x$ and $\tilde y$ are approximations to true numbers $x$ and $y$—whether the approximations arise from prior rounding error or from series truncation or from physical uncertainty or anything else—the error of the difference $\tilde x - \tilde y$ from the desired difference $x - y$ is inversely proportional to $x - y$. Thus, the closer $x$ and $y$ are, the worse $\tilde x - \tilde y$ may be as an approximation to $x - y$, even if the subtraction itself is computed exactly.

In other words, the Sterbenz lemma shows that subtracting nearby floating-point numbers is exact, but if the numbers one has are approximations then even their exact difference may be far off from the difference of numbers one wanted to subtract.

== Use in numerical analysis ==
The Sterbenz lemma is instrumental in proving theorems on error bounds in numerical analysis of floating-point algorithms. For example, Heron's formula
$$A = \sqrt{s (s - a) (s - b) (s - c)}$$
for the area of triangle with side lengths $a$, $b$, and $c$, where $s = (a + b + c)/2$ is the semi-perimeter, may give poor accuracy for long narrow triangles if evaluated directly in floating-point arithmetic. However, for $a \geq b \geq c$, the alternative formula
$$A = \frac{1}{4} \sqrt{\bigl(a + (b + c)\bigr) \bigl(c - (a - b)\bigr) \bigl(c + (a - b)\bigr) \bigl(a + (b - c)\bigr)}$$
can be proven, with the help of the Sterbenz lemma, to have low forward error for all inputs.
