= Quadratic function =

Polynomial function of degree two

In mathematics, a quadratic function of a single variable is a function of the form
$$f(x)=ax^2+bx+c$$
with $a \ne 0$, where $x$ is its variable, and $a$, $b$, and $c$ are coefficients. The expression $\textstyle ax^2+bx+c$, especially when treated as an object in itself rather than as a function, is a quadratic polynomial, a polynomial of degree two. In elementary mathematics a polynomial and its associated polynomial function are rarely distinguished and the terms quadratic function and quadratic polynomial are nearly synonymous and often abbreviated as quadratic.

A quadratic polynomial with two real roots (crossings of the x axis).

The graph of a real single-variable quadratic function is a parabola. If a quadratic function is equated with zero, then the result is a quadratic equation. The solutions of a quadratic equation are the zeros (or roots) of the corresponding quadratic function, of which there can be two, one, or zero. The solutions are described by the quadratic formula.

A quadratic polynomial or quadratic function can involve more than one variable. For example, a two-variable quadratic function of variables $x$ and $y$ has the form

$$f(x,y) = a x^2 + bx y+ cy^2 + d x+ ey + f ,$$

with at least one of $a$, $b$, and $c$ not equal to zero. In general the zeros of such a quadratic function describe a conic section (a circle or other ellipse, a parabola, or a hyperbola) in the $x$–$y$ plane. A quadratic function can have an arbitrarily large number of variables. The set of its zero form a quadric, which is a surface in the case of three variables and a hypersurface in general case.

== Etymology ==
The adjective quadratic comes from the Latin word quadrātum ("square"). A term raised to the second power like $\textstyle x^2$ is called a square in algebra because it is the area of a square with side $x$.

== Terminology ==
=== Coefficients ===
The coefficients of a quadratic function are often taken to be real or complex numbers, but they may be taken in any ring, in which case the domain and the codomain are this ring (see polynomial evaluation).

=== Degree ===
When using the term "quadratic polynomial", authors sometimes mean "having degree exactly 2", and sometimes "having degree at most 2". If the degree is less than 2, this may be called a "degenerate case". Usually the context will establish which of the two is meant.

Sometimes the word "order" is used with the meaning of "degree", e.g. a second-order polynomial. However, where the "degree of a polynomial" refers to the largest degree of a non-zero term of the polynomial, more typically "order" refers to the lowest degree of a non-zero term of a power series.

=== Variables ===
A quadratic polynomial may involve a single variable x (the univariate case), or multiple variables such as x, y, and z (the multivariate case).

==== The one-variable case ====
Any single-variable quadratic polynomial may be written as

$$ax^2 + bx + c,$$

where x is the variable, and a, b, and c represent the coefficients. Such polynomials often arise in a quadratic equation $ax^2 + bx + c = 0.$ The solutions to this equation are called the roots and can be expressed in terms of the coefficients as the quadratic formula. Each quadratic polynomial has an associated quadratic function, whose graph is a parabola.

==== Bivariate and multivariate cases ====
Any quadratic polynomial with two variables may be written as

$$a x^2 + b y^2 + cxy + dx+ e y + f,$$

where x and y are the variables and a, b, c, d, e, f are the coefficients, and one of a, b and c is nonzero. Such polynomials are fundamental to the study of conic sections, as the implicit equation of a conic section is obtained by equating to zero a quadratic polynomial, and the zeros of a quadratic function form a (possibly degenerate) conic section.

Similarly, quadratic polynomials with three or more variables correspond to quadric surfaces or hypersurfaces.

Quadratic polynomials that have only terms of degree two are called quadratic forms.

== Forms of a univariate quadratic function ==
A univariate quadratic function can be expressed in three formats:

- $f(x) = a x^2 + b x + c$ is called the standard form,
- $f(x) = a(x - r_1)(x - r_2)$ is called the factored form, where r_{1} and r_{2} are the roots of the quadratic function and the solutions of the corresponding quadratic equation.
- $f(x) = a(x - h)^2 + k$ is called the vertex form, where h and k are the x and y coordinates of the vertex, respectively.

The coefficient a is the same value in all three forms. To convert the standard form to factored form, one needs only the quadratic formula to determine the two roots r_{1} and r_{2}. To convert the standard form to vertex form, one needs a process called completing the square. To convert the factored form (or vertex form) to standard form, one needs to multiply, expand and/or distribute the factors.

== Graph of the univariate function ==
$f(x) = ax^2 |_{a\in\{0.1,0.3,1,3\}}$

$f(x) = x^2 + bx |_{b\in\{1,2,3,4\}}$

$f(x) = x^2 + bx |_{b\in\{-1,-2,-3,-4\}}$

Regardless of the format, the graph of a univariate quadratic function $f(x) = ax^2 + bx + c$ is a parabola (as shown at the right). Equivalently, this is the graph of the bivariate quadratic equation $y = ax^2 + bx + c$.

- If a > 0, the parabola opens upwards.
- If a < 0, the parabola opens downwards.

The coefficient a controls the degree of curvature of the graph; a larger magnitude of a gives the graph a more closed (sharply curved) appearance.

The coefficients b and a together control the location of the axis of symmetry of the parabola (also the x-coordinate of the vertex and the h parameter in the vertex form) which is at

$$x = -\frac{b}{2a}.$$

The coefficient c controls the height of the parabola; more specifically, it is the height of the parabola where it intercepts the y-axis.

=== Vertex ===
The vertex of a parabola is the place where it turns; hence, it is also called the turning point. If the quadratic function is in vertex form, the vertex is (h, k). Using the method of completing the square, one can turn the standard form

$$f(x) = a x^2 + b x + c$$

into

$$\begin{align}
f(x) &= a x^2 + b x + c \\
&= a (x - h)^2 + k \\
&= a\left(x - \frac{-b}{2a}\right)^2 + \left(c - \frac{b^2}{4a}\right),\\
\end{align}$$

so the vertex, (h, k), of the parabola in standard form is

$\left(-\frac{b}{2a}, c - \frac{b^2}{4a}\right).$

If the quadratic function is in factored form

$$f(x) = a(x - r_1)(x - r_2)$$

the average of the two roots, i.e.,

$$\frac{r_1 + r_2}{2}$$

is the x-coordinate of the vertex, and hence the vertex (h, k) is

$$\left(\frac{r_1 + r_2}{2}, f\left(\frac{r_1 + r_2}{2}\right)\right).$$

The vertex is also the maximum point if a < 0, or the minimum point if a > 0.

The vertical line

$$x=h=-\frac{b}{2a}$$

that passes through the vertex is also the axis of symmetry of the parabola.

==== Maximum and minimum points ====
Using calculus, the vertex point, being a maximum or minimum of the function, can be obtained by finding the roots of the derivative:

$$f(x)=ax^2+bx+c \quad \Rightarrow \quad f'(x)=2ax+b$$

x is a root of f '(x) if f '(x) = 0 resulting in

$$x=-\frac{b}{2a}$$

with the corresponding function value

$$f(x) = a \left (-\frac{b}{2a} \right)^2+b \left (-\frac{b}{2a} \right)+c = c-\frac{b^2}{4a},$$

so again the vertex point coordinates, (h, k), can be expressed as

$$\left (-\frac {b}{2a}, c-\frac {b^2}{4a} \right).$$

== Roots of the univariate function ==
Graph of y = ax^{2} + bx + c, where a and the discriminant b^{2} − 4ac are positive, with: Roots and y-intercept in red; Vertex and axis of symmetry in blue; Focus and directrix in pink

Visualisation of the complex roots of y = ax^{2} + bx + c: the parabola is rotated 180° about its vertex (orange). Its x-intercepts are rotated 90° around their mid-point, and the Cartesian plane is interpreted as the complex plane (green).

=== Exact roots ===
The roots (or zeros), r_{1} and r_{2}, of the univariate quadratic function

$$\begin{align}
f(x) &= ax^2+bx+c \\
&= a(x-r_1)(x-r_2), \\
\end{align}$$

are the values of x for which f(x) = 0.

When the coefficients a, b, and c, are real or complex, the roots are

$$r_1=\frac{-b - \sqrt{b^2-4ac}}{2a},$$

$$r_2=\frac{-b + \sqrt{b^2-4ac}}{2a}.$$

=== Upper bound on the magnitude of the roots ===
The modulus of the roots of a quadratic $ax^2+bx+c$ can be no greater than $\frac{\max(|a|, |b|, |c|)}{|a|}\times \phi,$ where $\phi$ is the golden ratio $\frac{1+\sqrt{5}}{2}.$

== The square root of a univariate quadratic function ==
The square root of a univariate quadratic function gives rise to one of the four conic sections, almost always either to an ellipse or to a hyperbola.

If $a>0,$ then the equation $y = \pm \sqrt{a x^2 + b x + c}$ describes a hyperbola, as can be seen by squaring both sides. The directions of the axes of the hyperbola are determined by the ordinate of the minimum point of the corresponding parabola $y_p = a x^2 + b x + c .$ If the ordinate is negative, then the hyperbola's major axis (through its vertices) is horizontal, while if the ordinate is positive then the hyperbola's major axis is vertical.

If $a<0,$ then the equation $y = \pm \sqrt{a x^2 + b x + c}$ describes either a circle or other ellipse or nothing at all. If the ordinate of the maximum point of the corresponding parabola $y_p = a x^2 + b x + c$ is positive, then its square root describes an ellipse, but if the ordinate is negative then it describes an empty locus of points.

== Iteration ==
To iterate a function $f(x)=ax^2+bx+c$, one applies the function repeatedly, using the output from one iteration as the input to the next.

One cannot always deduce the analytic form of $f^{(n)}(x)$, which means the n^{th} iteration of $f(x)$. (The superscript can be extended to negative numbers, referring to the iteration of the inverse of $f(x)$ if the inverse exists.) But there are some analytically tractable cases.

For example, for the iterative equation

$$f(x)=a(x-c)^2+c$$

one has

$$f(x)=a(x-c)^2+c=h^{(-1)}(g(h(x))),$$

where

$g(x)=ax^2$ and $h(x)=x-c.$

So by induction,

$$f^{(n)}(x)=h^{(-1)}(g^{(n)}(h(x)))$$

can be obtained, where $g^{(n)}(x)$ can be easily computed as

$$g^{(n)}(x)=a^{2^{n}-1}x^{2^{n}}.$$

Finally, we have

$$f^{(n)}(x)=a^{2^n-1}(x-c)^{2^n}+c$$

as the solution.

See Topological conjugacy for more detail about the relationship between f and g. And see Complex quadratic polynomial for the chaotic behavior in the general iteration.

The logistic map

$$x_{n+1} = r x_n (1-x_n), \quad  0\leq x_0<1$$

with parameter 2<r<4 can be solved in certain cases, one of which is chaotic and one of which is not. In the chaotic case r=4 the solution is

$$x_{n}=\sin^{2}(2^{n} \theta \pi)$$

where the initial condition parameter $\theta$ is given by $\theta = \tfrac{1}{\pi}\sin^{-1}(x_0^{1/2})$. For rational $\theta$, after a finite number of iterations $x_n$ maps into a periodic sequence. But almost all $\theta$ are irrational, and, for irrational $\theta$, $x_n$ never repeats itself – it is non-periodic and exhibits sensitive dependence on initial conditions, so it is said to be chaotic.

The solution of the logistic map when r=2 is

$x_n = \frac{1}{2} - \frac{1}{2}(1-2x_0)^{2^{n}}$

for $x_0 \in [0,1)$. Since $(1-2x_0)\in (-1,1)$ for any value of $x_0$ other than the unstable fixed point 0, the term $(1-2x_0)^{2^{n}}$ goes to 0 as n goes to infinity, so $x_n$ goes to the stable fixed point $\tfrac{1}{2}.$

== Bivariate (two variable) quadratic function ==
A bivariate quadratic function is a second-degree polynomial of the form

$$f(x,y) = A x^2 + B y^2 + C x + D y + E x y + F,$$

where A, B, C, D, and E are fixed coefficients and F is the constant term. Such a function describes a quadratic surface. Setting $f(x,y)$ equal to zero describes the intersection of the surface with the plane $z=0,$ which is a locus of points equivalent to a conic section.

=== Minimum/maximum ===
If $4AB-E^2 <0 ,$ the function has no maximum or minimum; its graph forms a hyperbolic paraboloid.

If $4AB-E^2 >0 ,$ the function has a minimum if both A > 0 and B > 0, and a maximum if both A < 0 and B < 0; its graph forms an elliptic paraboloid. In this case the minimum or maximum occurs at $(x_m, y_m) ,$ where:

$$x_m = -\frac{2BC-DE}{4AB-E^2},$$

$$y_m = -\frac{2AD-CE}{4AB-E^2}.$$

If $4AB- E^2 =0$ and $DE-2CB=2AD-CE \ne 0 ,$ the function has no maximum or minimum; its graph forms a parabolic cylinder.

If $4AB- E^2 =0$ and $DE-2CB=2AD-CE =0 ,$ the function achieves the maximum/minimum at a line—a minimum if A>0 and a maximum if A<0; its graph forms a parabolic cylinder.

== See also ==
- Quadratic form
- Quadratic equation
- Matrix representation of conic sections
- Quadric
- Periodic points of complex quadratic mappings
- List of mathematical functions
