= Pat Holmes Sterbenz =

American mathematician and computer scientist (1927–2008)

Pat Holmes Sterbenz (July 30, 1927 – July 26, 2008) was an American mathematician and computer scientist. He worked at IBM and later was a professor of computer and information science at Brooklyn College. He is best known for his textbook Floating-Point Computation (1974), one of the first systematic treatments of floating-point arithmetic, and for the Sterbenz lemma named after him, which states conditions under which floating-point subtraction is exact.

== Life ==
Sterbenz was born in Ohio on July 30, 1927. He earned a Bachelor of Science degree from Ohio Wesleyan University in Delaware, Ohio, where he met Nancy Norton, whom he married in 1949; the couple had five children. In 1953 he received a PhD in mathematics from Ohio State University with the dissertation Some Topics in Cohomology Theory, written under the supervision of Paul V. Reichelderfer.

Sterbenz then joined IBM, where he worked in the emerging field of computer science. At the IBM Systems Research Institute in New York City he taught a course on floating-point computation for several years, out of which his textbook grew. In the early 1970s he left IBM to become a professor of computer and information science at Brooklyn College.

A longtime resident of Larchmont, New York, Sterbenz died on July 26, 2008, after several weeks of hospitalization.

== Work ==
Together with C. T. Fike, Sterbenz wrote two papers on optimal starting values for the computation of square roots by Newton's method.

His book Floating-Point Computation presents floating-point arithmetic in a generalized form that allows for variations in radix and word length, and discusses the arithmetic of the IBM System/360 in detail. It contains the result now known as the Sterbenz lemma (Theorem 4.3.1): if y/2 ≤ x ≤ 2y, then the floating-point difference x − y is computed exactly. The lemma remains a standard tool in the error analysis of numerical algorithms under IEEE 754 arithmetic.

== Selected publications ==
- Sterbenz, P. H.; Fike, C. T. (1969). "Optimal starting approximations for Newton's method". Mathematics of Computation. 23 (106): 313–318. doi:10.2307/2004425. JSTOR 2004425. MR 0245199.
- Fike, C. T.; Sterbenz, P. H. (1971). "Minimax approximations subject to a constraint". Mathematics of Computation. 25 (114): 295–298. doi:10.2307/2004923. JSTOR 2004923. MR 0303176.
- Sterbenz, Pat H. (1974). Floating-Point Computation. Prentice-Hall Series in Automatic Computation. Englewood Cliffs, NJ: Prentice-Hall. ISBN 0-13-322495-3. MR 0349062.
- Sterbenz, Pat H. (1975). Understandable arithmetic. 3rd IEEE Symposium on Computer Arithmetic (ARITH). pp. 33–35. doi:10.1109/ARITH.1975.6157004.
