= Saint John the Baptist as a Boy =

Saint John the Baptist as a Boy may refer to:

- Saint John the Baptist as a Boy (Andrea del Sarto)
- Saint John the Baptist as a Boy (Raphael)
- The Infant Saint John the Baptist (Rosso Fiorentino)
- Saint John the Baptist as a Boy (Wautier)
