= Giovanni Sfortunati =

Italian mathematician

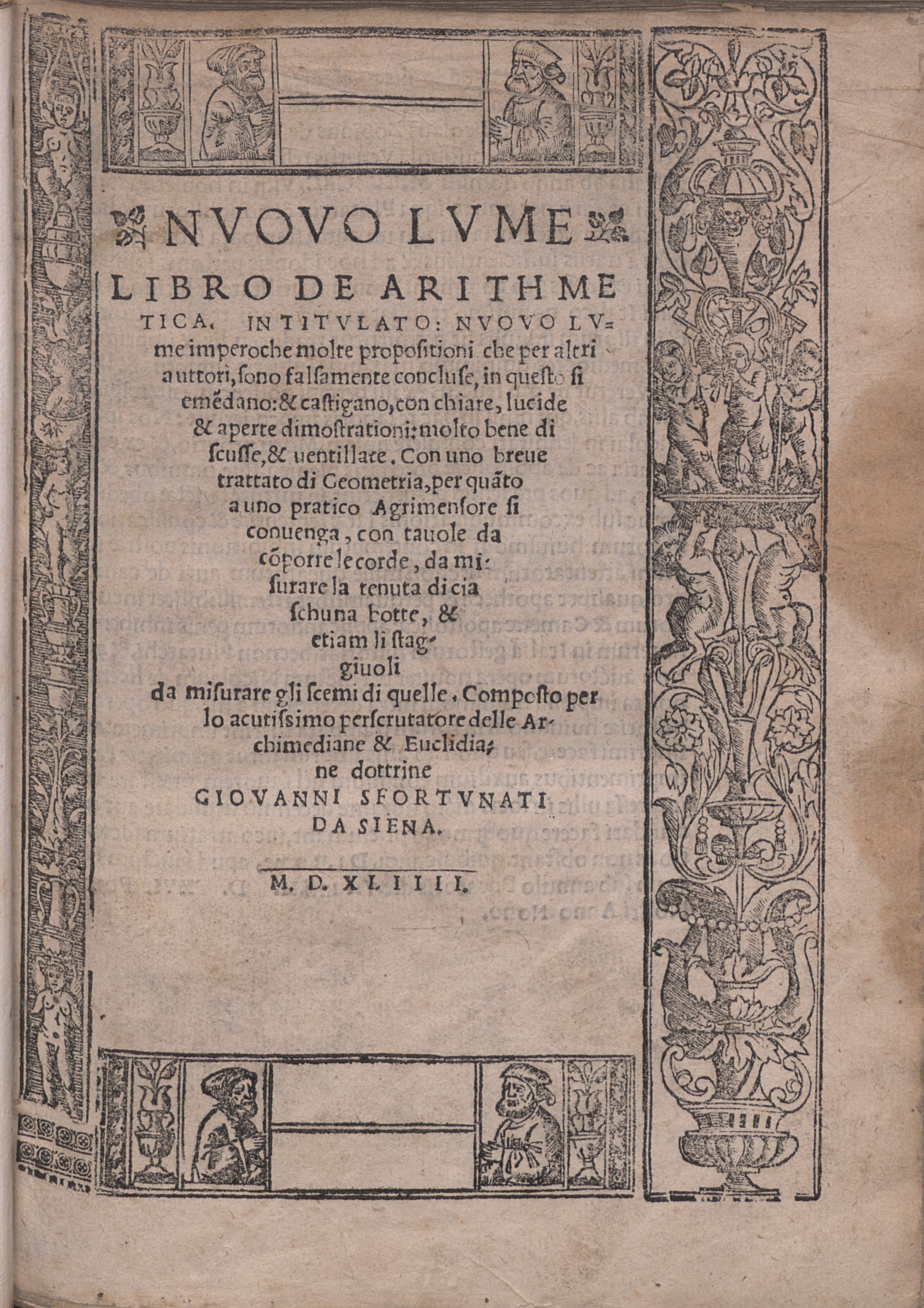
Nuovo lume, 1544

Giovanni Sfortunati (active in the 16th century) was an Italian mathematician.

Sfrtunati was born in Siena. His book Nuovo lume ("New light", 1544) was one of the main sources for the work General trattato de' numeri et misure by Niccolò Tartaglia.

== Works ==
- Nuovo lume (in Italian). Bernardino Bindoni. 1544.
