= Santa Maria Assunta, Settignano =

Parish church in Settignano, Florence, Italy

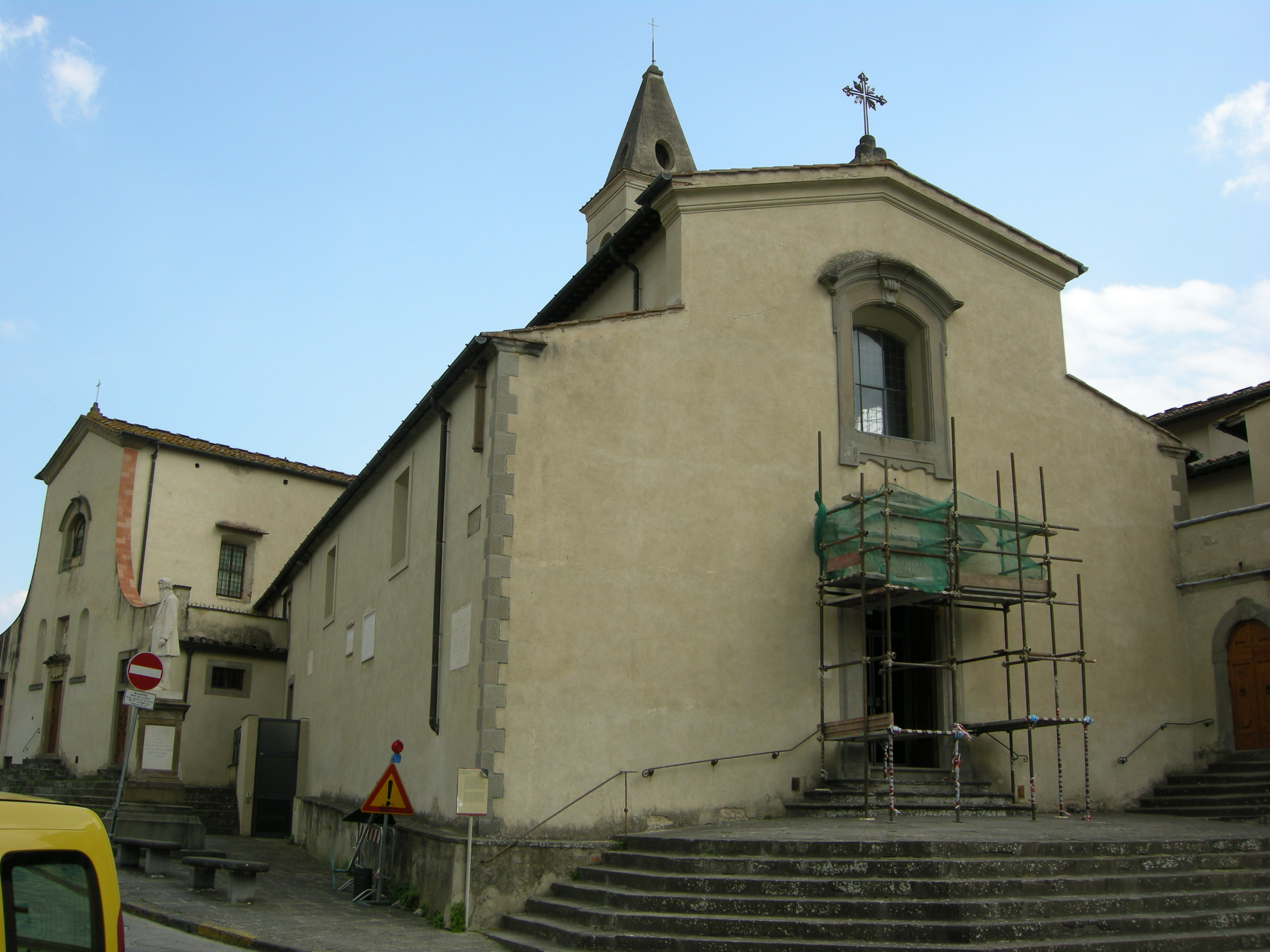
Santa Maria Assunta a settignano

Santa Maria Assunta is a Roman Catholic parish church located in Settignano, a frazione of Florence in the region of Tuscany, Italy.

== Description ==
A church at this site was originally founded in the 12th century, but underwent a reconstruction in 1518. In 1595, two naves were added under the direction of Alessandro di Francesco Bandini. Among the ancient Florentine families who patronized the church were the Alessandri, Alamanni, Giugni, and Falconieri. The external facade is plain with only an early 16th-century terracotta with a Virgin and child with young St John. Also in 14th century, a series of facial masks are embedded in walls.

The interior contains a fresco of the Resurrection by Maso da San Friano; in the chapel of the Holy Sacrament is a Last Supper (1615) by Andrea Commodi. The church also has frescoes (1593) by Santi di Tito also with a statue of Santa Lucia. The main altar has a 15th-century crucifix and the apse cupola frescoes were painted by Pier Dandini. A terracotta Madonna and Child with Angels by Andrea della Robbia is housed in the church. It also houses a baptismal font (1745), a 15th-century ciborium, and a wooden pulpit (1602) whose design is attributed to Bernardo Buontalenti and sculpture to Gherardo Silvani. The church once had paintings by Cigoli.

Adjacent to the church is the Oratory of the Holy Trinity, with frescoes of the Adoration of the Infant Jesus by a pupil of Desiderio da Settignano. The piazza of the church has a statue dedicated to Niccolò Tommaseo by the sculptor Leopoldo Costoli.

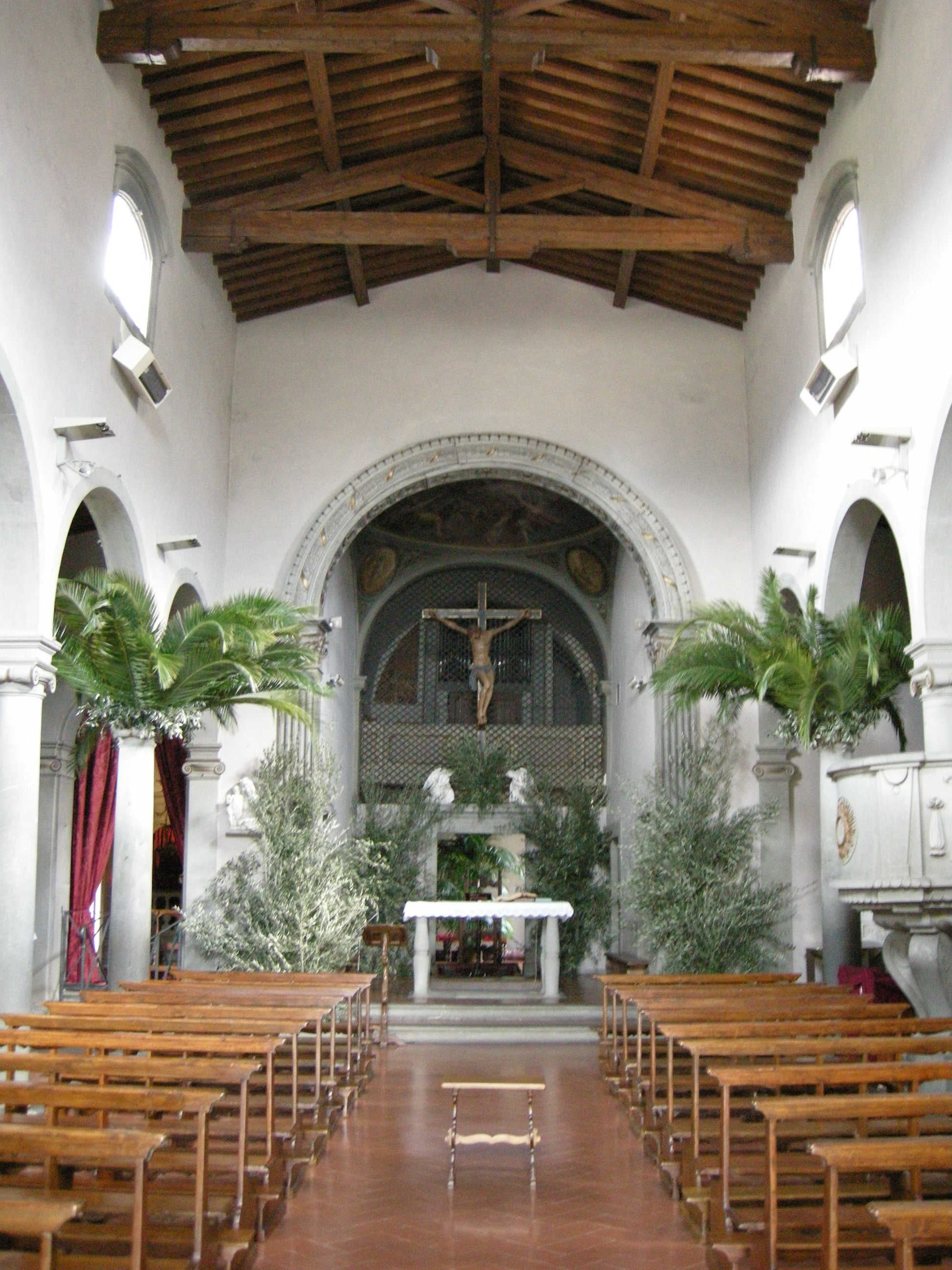
Interior

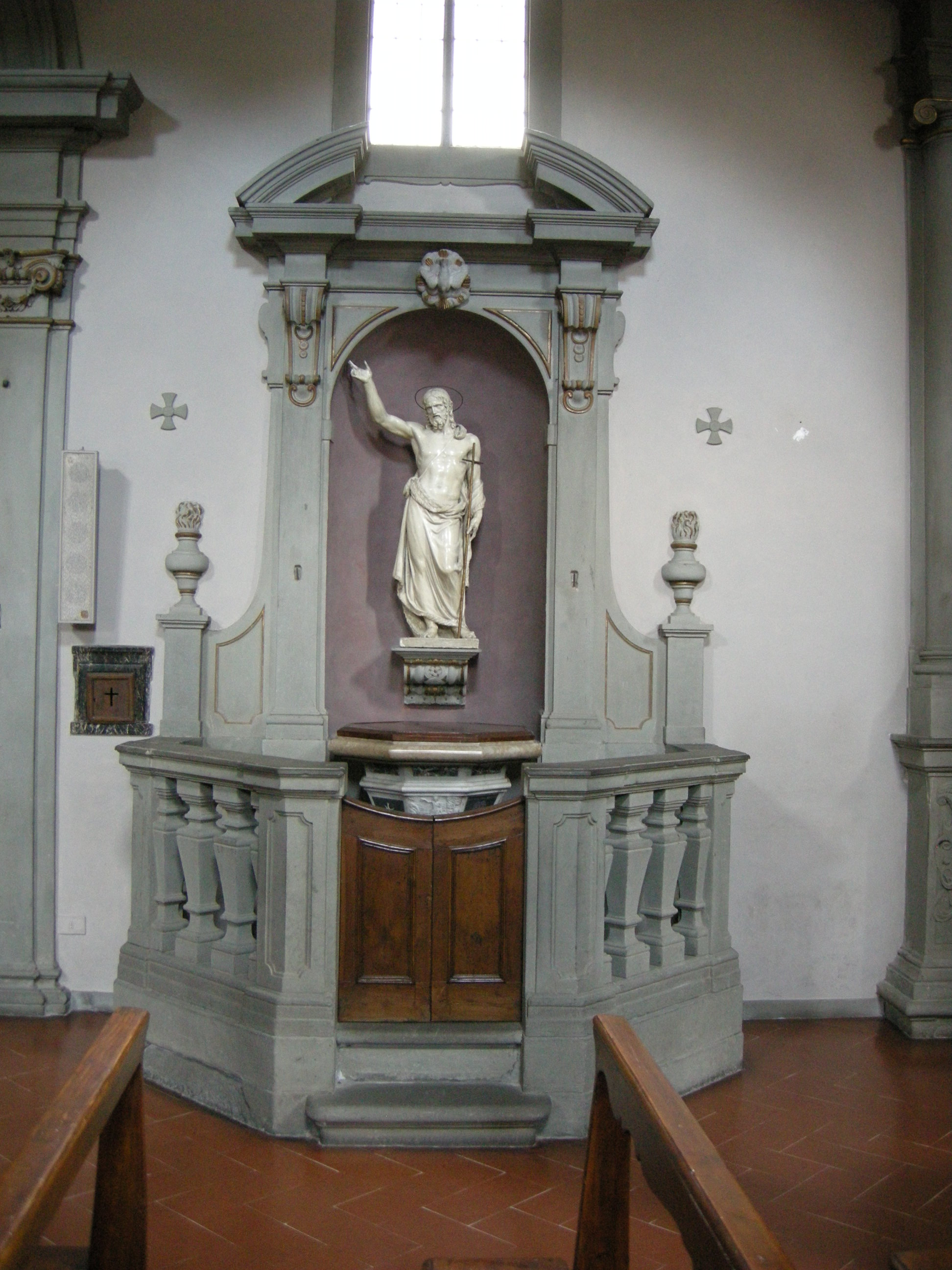
Baptismal font

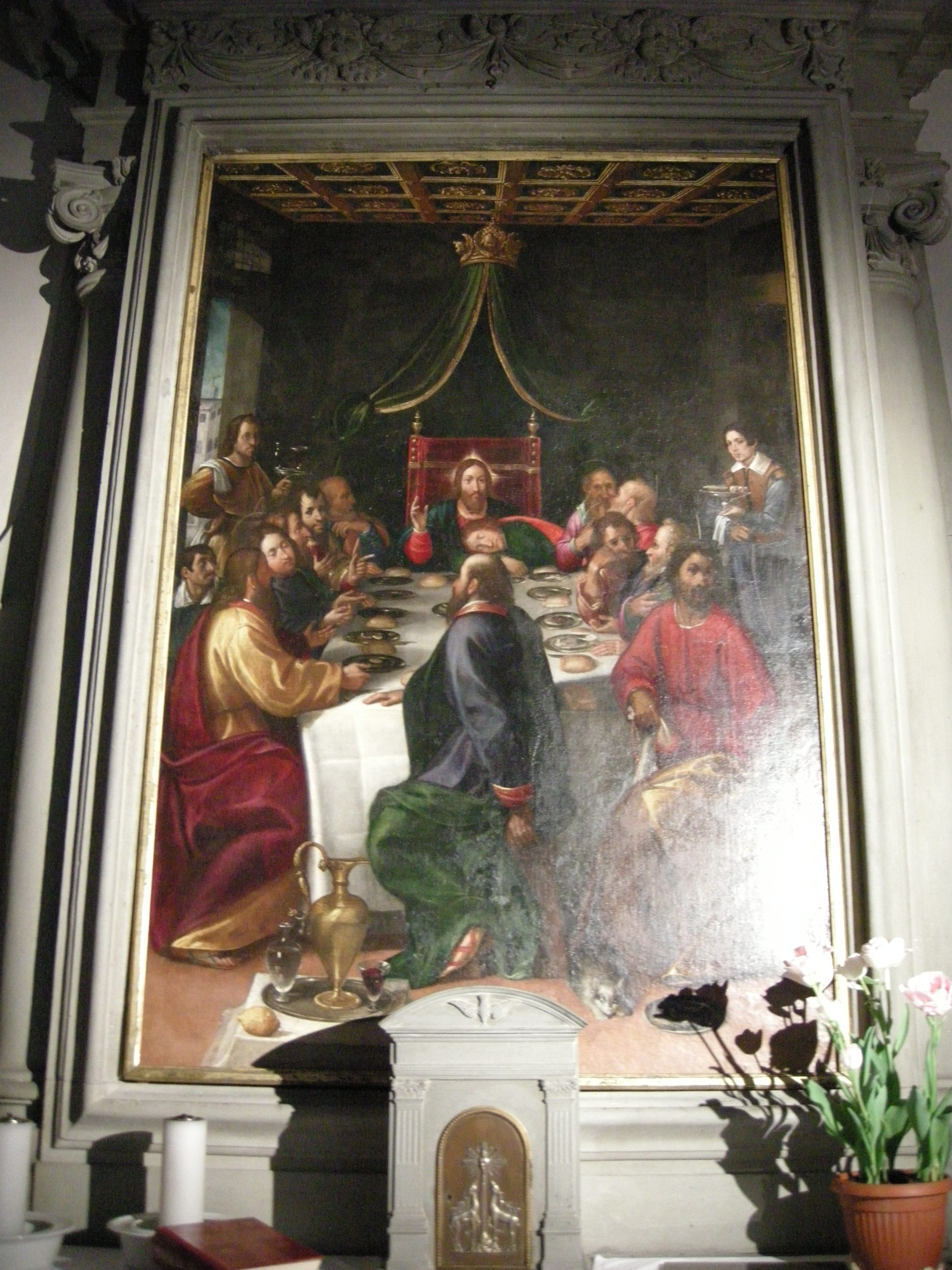
Last Supper by Andrea Commodi

== Bibliography ==
- Francesco Lumachi, Firenze, nuova guida illustrata storica-artistica-aneddotica della città e dintorni, Firenze, Società Editrice Fiorentina, 1929
- Entry in "Luoghi della Fede", Regione Toscana
- Parish church of Santa Maria Assunta
