= Giovanni Battista Stefaneschi =

Tuscan painter

Saint John the Baptist as a Boy, after Raphael, oil on parchment, before 1638, Florence, Uffizi

Giovanni Battista Stefaneschi, also known as l'Eremita di Monte Senario (1582 – 31 October 1659), was a Tuscan painter of the Baroque period.

== Biography ==
Giovanni Battista Stefaneschi was born in Ronta, a frazione of Borgo San Lorenzo. He entered the Servite monastery of Monte Senario at the age of 22 and was ordained a priest on 1 January 1606. Stefaneschi was a pupil of the painter Andrea Commodi and was also influenced by Jacopo Ligozzi and Pietro da Cortona. He was highly regarded by the Grand Duke of Tuscany, Ferdinando II de' Medici, for whom he painted various copies in miniature of works by Old Masters, including the Dispute of the Trinity by Andrea del Sarto, the Adoration of the Shepherds by Titian, the Saint John the Baptist as a Boy by Raphael, and the Madonna Adoring the Child by Correggio. Most of his works are in the Uffizi in Florence. Stefaneschi died in Venice on 31 October 1659. A self-portrait dating to his later years, once in the collection of Cardinal Leopoldo de' Medici, is now housed in the Uffizi.
