= Settignano =

Frazione on a hillside northeast of Florence, Italy

Coordinates: 43°47′N 11°19′E

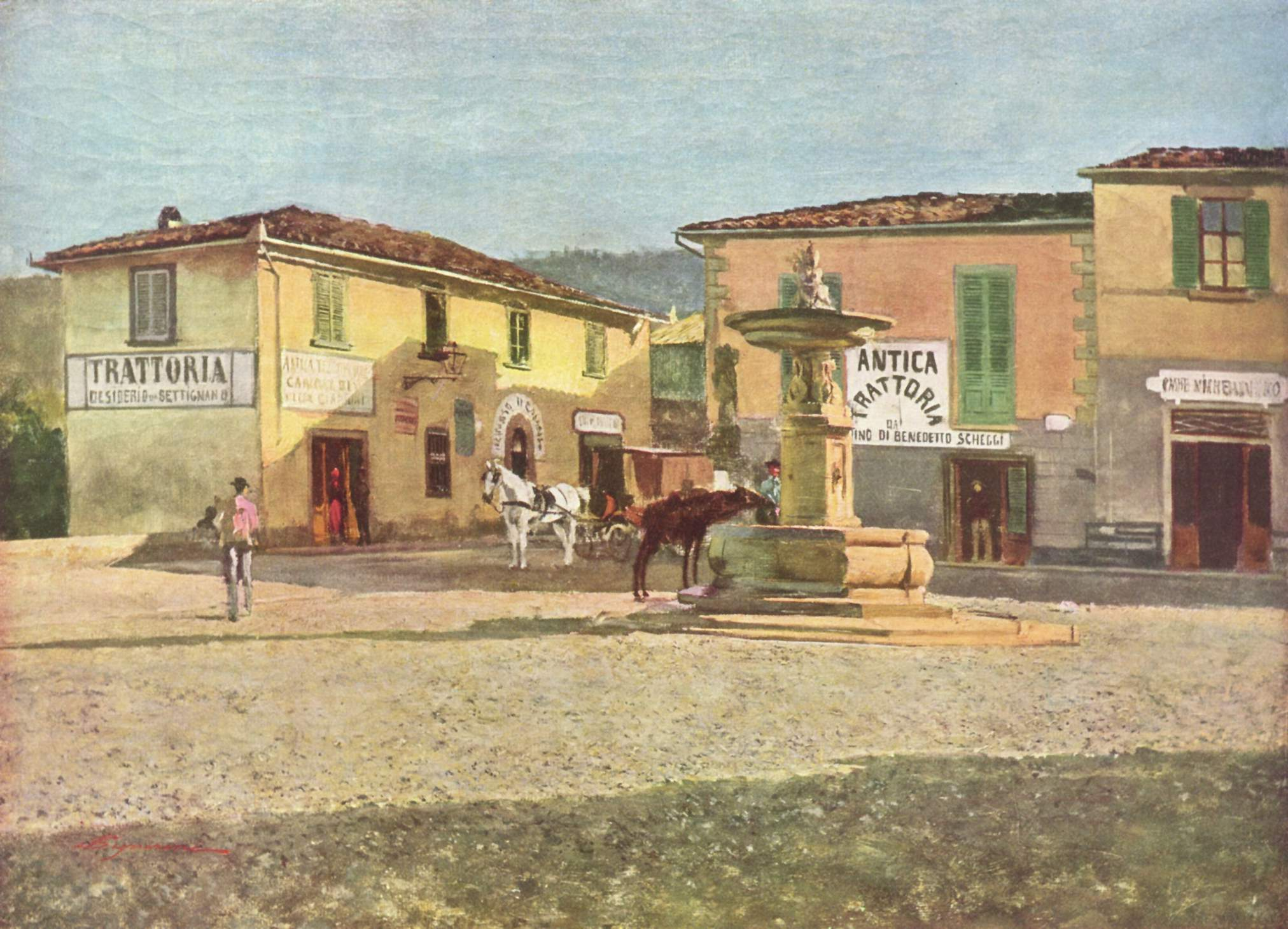
La piazza di Settignano, Telemaco Signorini, 1880

Settignano is a frazione on a hillside northeast of Florence, Italy. The little borgo of Settignano carries a familiar name for having produced three sculptors of the Florentine Renaissance, Desiderio da Settignano and the Gamberini brothers, better known as Bernardo Rossellino and Antonio Rossellino. The young Michelangelo lived with a sculptor and his wife in Settignano—in a farmhouse that is now the "Villa Michelangelo"— where his father owned a marble quarry. In 1511 another sculptor was born there, Bartolomeo Ammannati. The marble quarries of Settignano produced this series of sculptors.

Roman remains are to be found in the borgo which some have claimed was named after Settimio or Septimius Severus—in whose honor a statue was erected in the oldest square in the 16th century, destroyed in 1944— though habitation here long preceded the Roman emperor. The name may be a corruption from the term Fundus Septimianus.

Settignano was a secure resort for estivation for members of the Guelf faction of Florence. Giovanni Boccaccio and Niccolò Tommaseo both appreciated its freshness, among the vineyards and olive groves that are the preferred setting for even the most formal Italian gardens.

Mark Twain and his wife stayed at the Villa Viviani in Settignano from September 1892 to June 1893. While there, Twain wrote 1,800 pages including a first draft of Pudd'nhead Wilson. He said the villa "afford[ed] the most charming view to be found on this planet".

In 1898, Gabriele d'Annunzio purchased the trecento Villa della Capponcina on the outskirts of Settignano, in order to be nearer to his lover Eleonora Duse, at the Villa Porziuncola. Near Settignano are the Villa Gamberaia, a 14th-century villa with an 18th-century terraced garden, and secluded Villa I Tatti, the villa of Bernard Berenson, now a center of Italian Renaissance studies run by Harvard University.

In 2019 Carolyn McPherson said: "My family lived in Settignano in 1955 and 1956; I was 10. Many houses in the village were badly damaged, apparently by explosives. We were able to rent a villa about 1/4 of a mile from the entrance to the Villa Gamberaia. We were told that the Gamberaia had been headquarters for the Nazi command in Florence, and that the owner of our villa had been a collaborator with the Germans and thus was a persona non grata in the village. In 1955--10 years after the end of WWII--it was still possible to find large fragments of burned maps lying in the olive groves below the Gamberaia. We visited the famous gardens once; most of the trees and shrubs were dead, and the statuary broken".

Settignano houses the parish church of Santa Maria Assunta with its artworks.
