= Adoration of the Magi (Pontormo) =

Painting by Pontormo

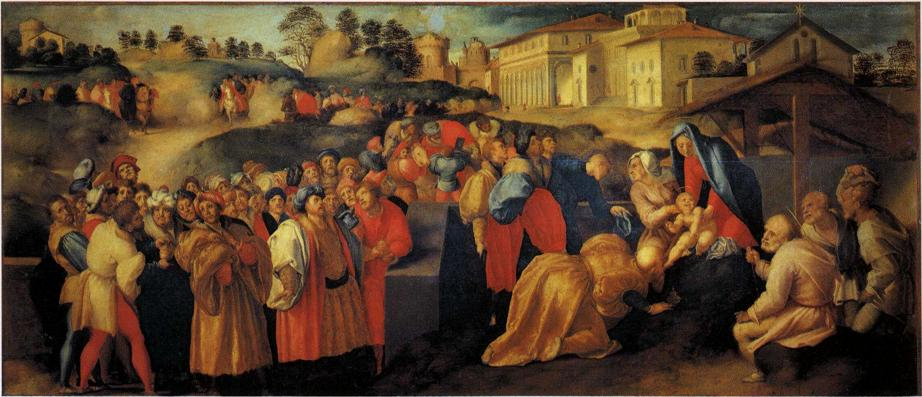
Adoration of the Magi (c. 1522–1523) by Pontormo

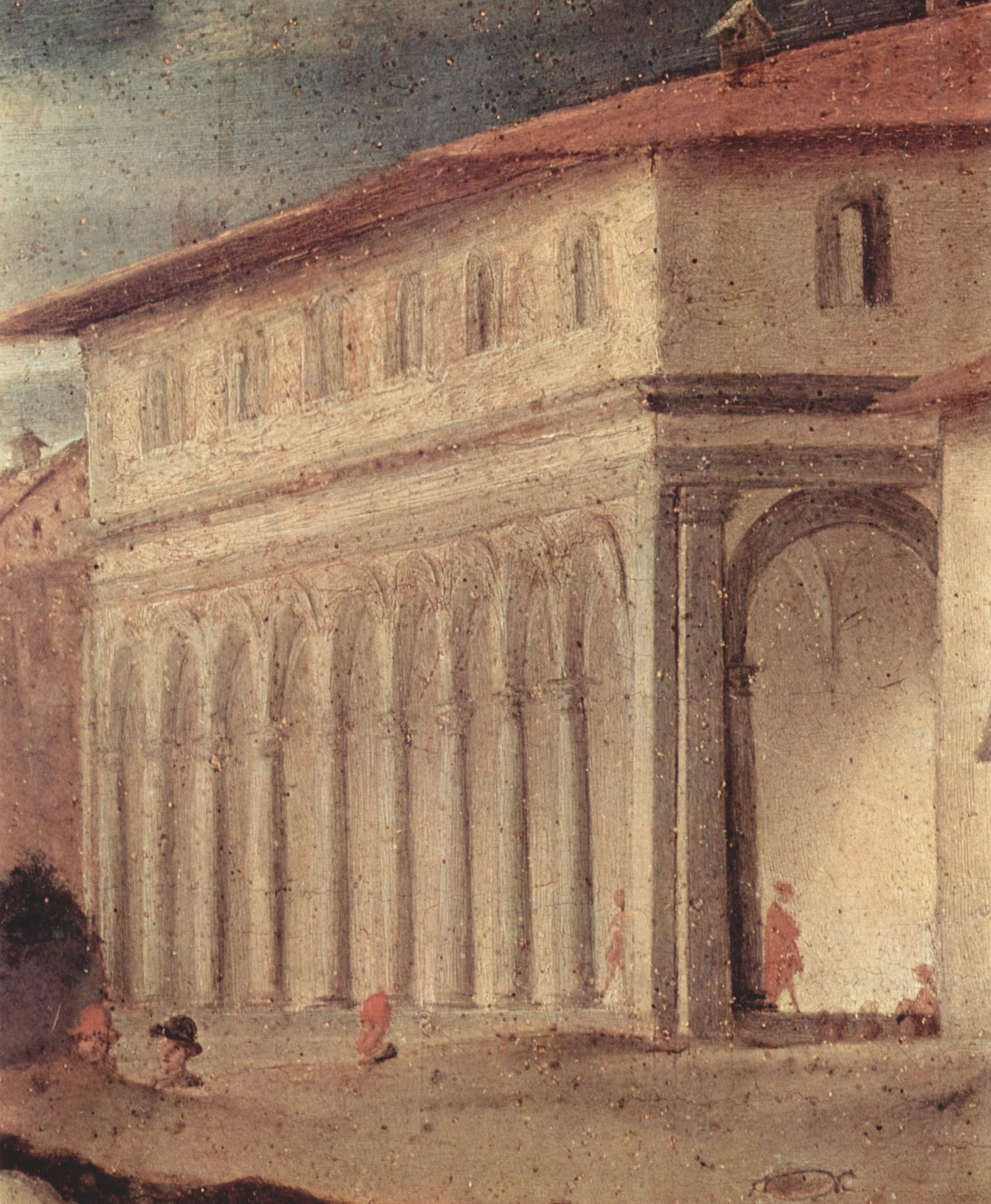
Detail

Adoration of the Magi is a c.1522-1523 oil on panel painting by Pontormo, produced for the antechamber of Giovan Maria Benitendi's palazzo in Florence and now in the Galleria Palatina in the same city.

== History ==
It was commissioned to be inserted into the room's wooden paneling, alongside works by other artists, in the manner of the slightly earlier Marriage Chamber in Florence's Palazzo Borgherini, to which Pontormo also contributed. The other works in the antechamber were Franciabigio's Bathsheba Bathing (Gemäldegalerie, Dresden) and Bacchiacca's Legend of the Dead King's Son (Gemäldegalerie, Dresden) and Baptism of Christ (Gemäldegalerie, Berlin), all surmounted by a larger work, Andrea del Sarto's Saint John the Baptist as a Boy (Galleria Palatina, Florence).

The work's landscape, crowds and grotesques evoke contemporary North European prints by artists such as Lucas van Leyden and Dürer, then circulating as far as Florence and beyond. Unusually for an Adoration of the Magi, the work shows saint Anne (behind the Virgin Mary). She and the image of the Verzaia Monastery in the right background recall the annual procession from Orsanmichele to that monastery on Anne's feast day (26 July) in memory of the expulsion of the Duke of Athens.
