= Andrea Commodi =

Italian painter (1560–1638)

- Judith with the Head of Holofernes, early 17th century, Musée des Beaux-Arts de Dijon
- Born: 1560; Florence, Grand Duchy of Tuscany
- Died: 24 September 1638 (aged 77–78); Florence, Grand Duchy of Tuscany
- Education: Alessandro Allori; Cigoli
- Known for: Painting
- Movement: Baroque

Andrea Commodi (1560 – 24 September 1638) was an Italian painter of the early-Baroque period.

== Biography ==
Born in Florence, in 1560, Commodi was a pupil a pupil of Allori and Cigoli. Like Cigoli, he was influenced by Correggio, Federico Barocci, and the Venetian School. From 1592 to 1614, Commodi lived in Rome, where he realized his most important works. He had a particularly close relationship with the Jesuit Order, from whom he received numerous commissions. During the Holy Year of 1600, he painted frescoes in the apse of the Jesuit church of San Vitale, working alongside Northern European artists such as Aert Mijtens. Around 1605, assisted by the young Baccio Ciarpi, Commodi painted a cycle of frescoes depicting scenes from the life of Ignatius of Loyola, the founder of the Jesuit Order, for the Church of the Gesù in Rome.

At the beginning of the 17th century, Commodi developed close ties with the Baroque painter Pietro da Cortona. During this period, he created a series of altarpieces characterised by sharp naturalism and dramatic chiaroscuro effects. Notable commissions from this period include the great altarpiece depicting St. Charles Borromeo in Prayer for the high altar of San Carlo ai Catinari (c. 1618). The grand fresco depicting The Fall of the Rebel Angels, commissioned by Pope Paul V for his Palazzo Montecavallo on the Quirinal Hill, remained unfinished. Commodi's oil-on-canvas modello (preparatory sketch) is housed in the Uffizi Galleri in Florence.

From the brief biographical sketch of Commodi drawn by Giulio Mancini in his Considerazioni sulla pittura we know that in his house in Rome Commodi established an informal academy attended by promising young artists, including Domenico Fetti and Baccio Ciarpi. After leaving Rome, Commodi worked in Cortona and Bologna before returning to Florence in 1623, where he presumably remained until his death. Due to a lack of verified works and documentation, the final phase of his career remains largely obscure. One notable exception is his self-portrait, (Florence, Casa Buonarroti). He died in Florence on 24 September 1638. Commodi ran a large workshop that included several young promising Tuscan artists. The most important of his pupils was Pietro da Cortona who moved to Rome and became one of the towering figures of the Italian High Baroque. Another pupil was the Florentine painter and monk Giovanni Battista Stefaneschi (1582–1659).

== Gallery ==
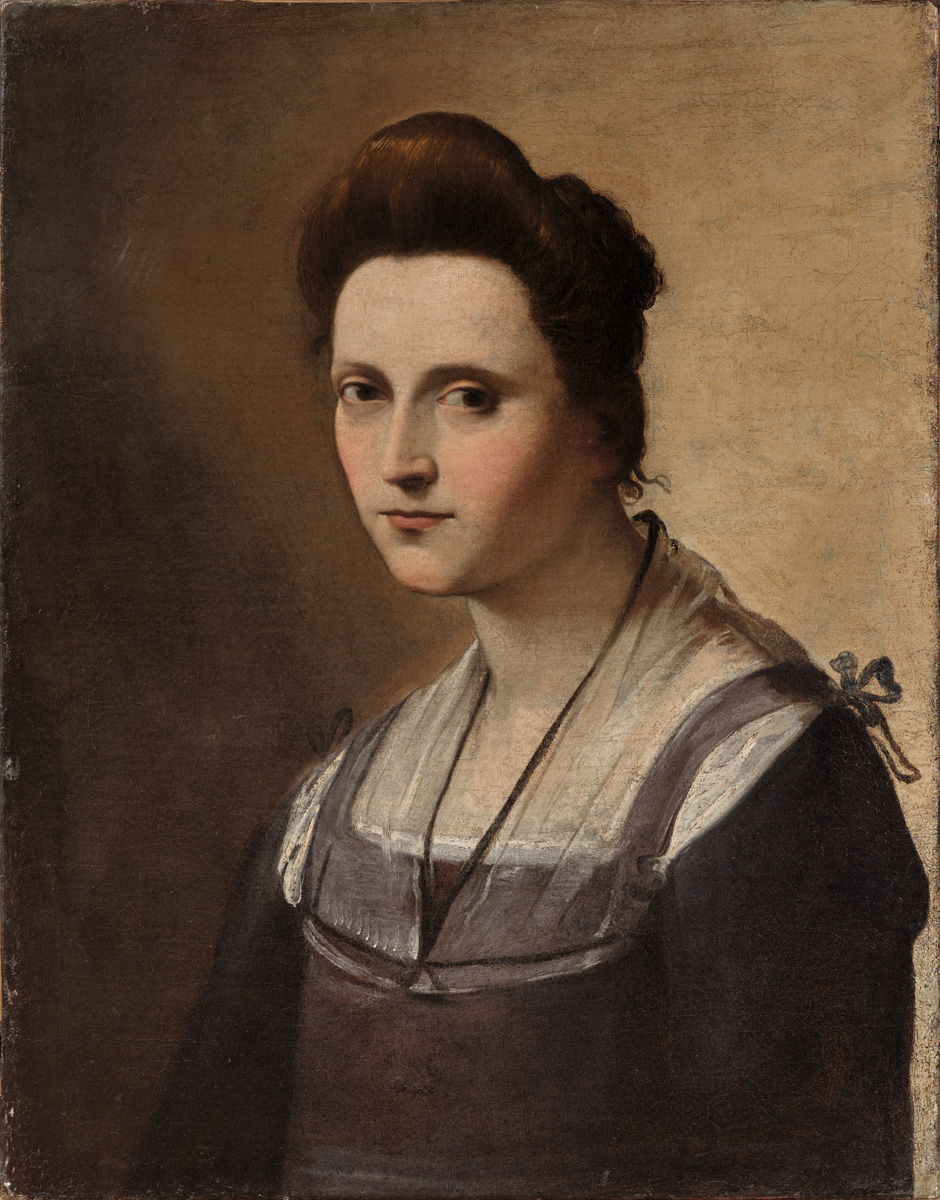
Portrait of a Woman, c. 1590-1600, Musée des Augustins, Toulouse

Tobias Restoring the Sight of his Father, c. 1630-35, Florence Charterhouse

Andrea Commodi, Consecration of the Church of the Savior, 1603, Cortona Cathedral

The Fall of the Rebel Angels, c. 1614-17. Uffizi, Florence

The Last Supper, c. 1580-95, Santa Maria Assunta, Settignano

Young Woman Cooking (Detail), 1610-15, Florence, priv. col.

== Bibliography ==
- Sricchia Santoro, Fiorella (1982). "COMODI, Andrea". Dizionario Biografico degli Italiani (in Italian). Vol. 27: Collenuccio–Confortini. Rome: Institute of the Italian Encyclopaedia. ISBN 978-88-12-00032-6.
- Briganti, Giuliano (1960). "L'occasione mancata di Andrea Commodi". Paragone. 123: 33–37.
- "Commodi, Andrea". Benezit Dictionary of Artists. Oxford: Oxford University Press. 2011. doi:10.1093/benz/9780199773787.article.B00041050.
