= Ostilio Ricci =

Italian mathematician (1540–1603)

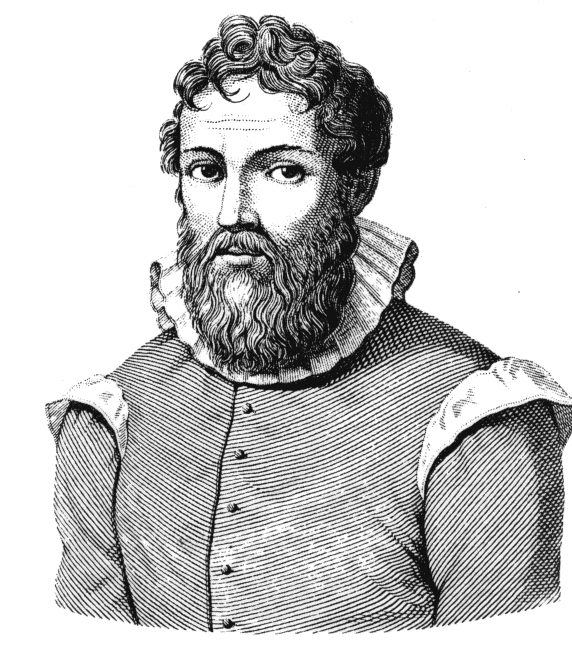
- Born: 27 September 1540; Fermo, Papal States
- Died: 4 May 1603 (aged 62); Florence, Grand Duchy of Tuscany
- Scientific career
- Fields: Mathematician
- Institutions: Accademia delle Arti del Disegno
- Academic advisors: Niccolò Tartaglia
- Notable students: Lodovico Cardi; Galileo Galilei

Ostilio Ricci da Fermo (1540–1603) was an Italian mathematician.

== Biography ==
He was a university professor in Florence at the Accademia delle Arti del Disegno, founded in 1560 by Giorgio Vasari. Ricci is also known for being Galileo Galilei's teacher.

Ricci was the Court Mathematician to the Grand Duke Francesco de' Medici in Florence, in 1580, when Galileo attended his lectures in Pisa.

Galileo was enrolled at the University of Pisa, by his father Vincenzo, in order to study medicine. Instead, Galilei became more interested in mathematics, after meeting Ostilio Ricci, a former student of Niccolò Tartaglia. Ricci taught Galileo the mathematics of Euclid and Archimedes, who both deeply influenced Galileo's later work. Ricci considered mathematics not to be a distinct science, but a practical tool for problems in mechanics and engineering. Ostilio Ricci is systematically cited in the various biographies of Galileo Galilei.

He died at age 62, in Florence. Italy. His cause of death remains unknown.

== Works ==
- Ostilio Ricci (c. 1590), Problemi di Geometria Pratica: L'uso dell'Archimetro, Manuscript, Florence, Biblioteca Nazionale Centrale, II._.57, c. 37r.
