= Cigoli, San Miniato =

Cigoli
- Frazione
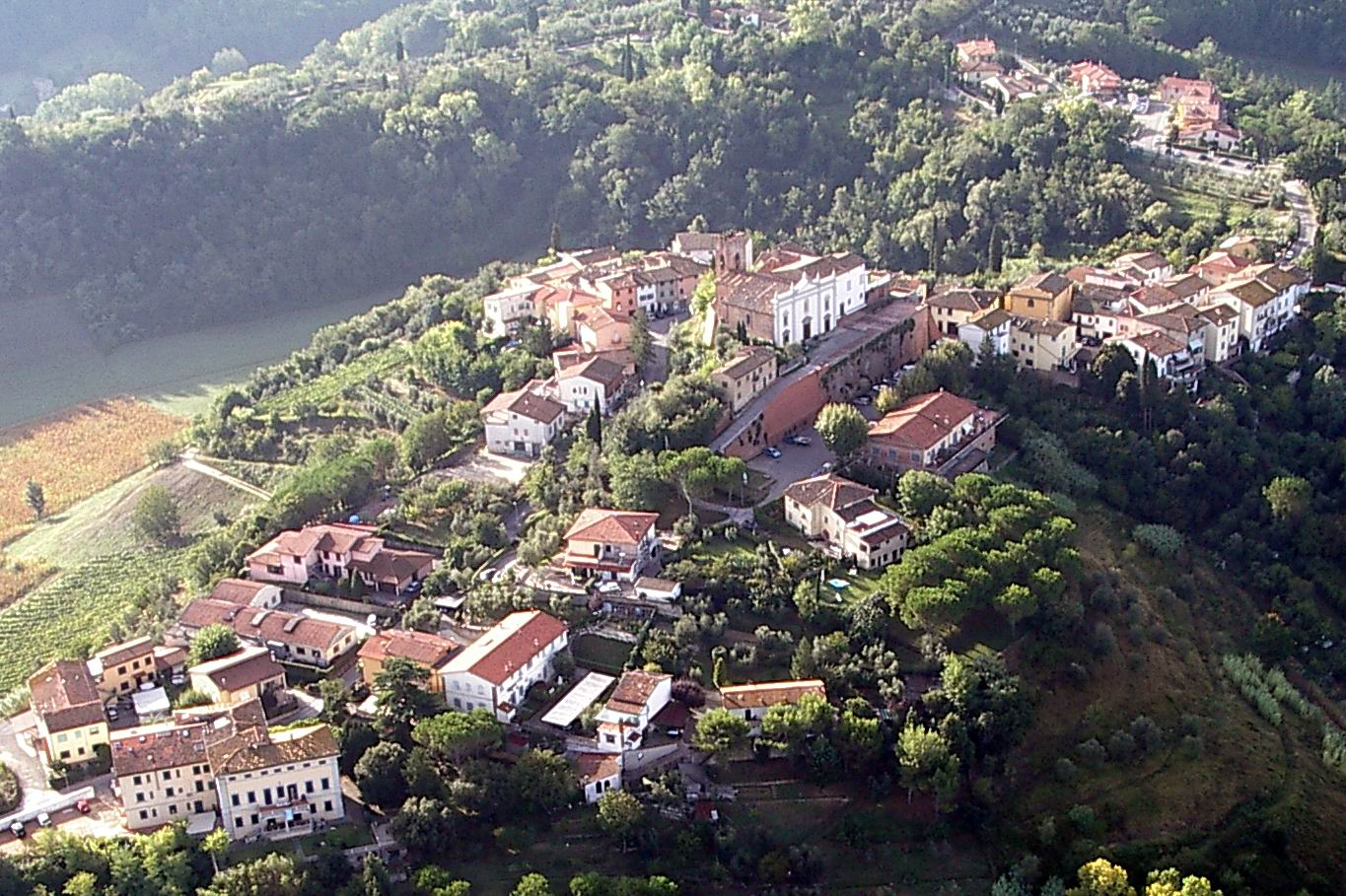

- Location of Cigoli in Italy
- Coordinates: 43°40′57″N 10°48′54″E
- Country: Italy
- Region: Tuscany
- Province: Pisa (PI)
- Comune: San Miniato
- Elevation: 78 m (256 ft)

Population
  - Total: 3,520
- Time zone: UTC+1 (CET)
  - Summer (DST): UTC+2 (CEST)
- Postal code: 56028
- Dialing code: (+39) 0571

Cigoli is a village in Tuscany, central Italy, administratively a frazione of the comune of San Miniato, province of Pisa.

Cigoli is about 44 km from Pisa and 5 km from San Miniato. The painter Lodovico Cardi, known as "Cigoli", was born in the town in 1559.
