= Nicolo Tartaglia =

Italian mathematician (1499–1557)

Tartaglia
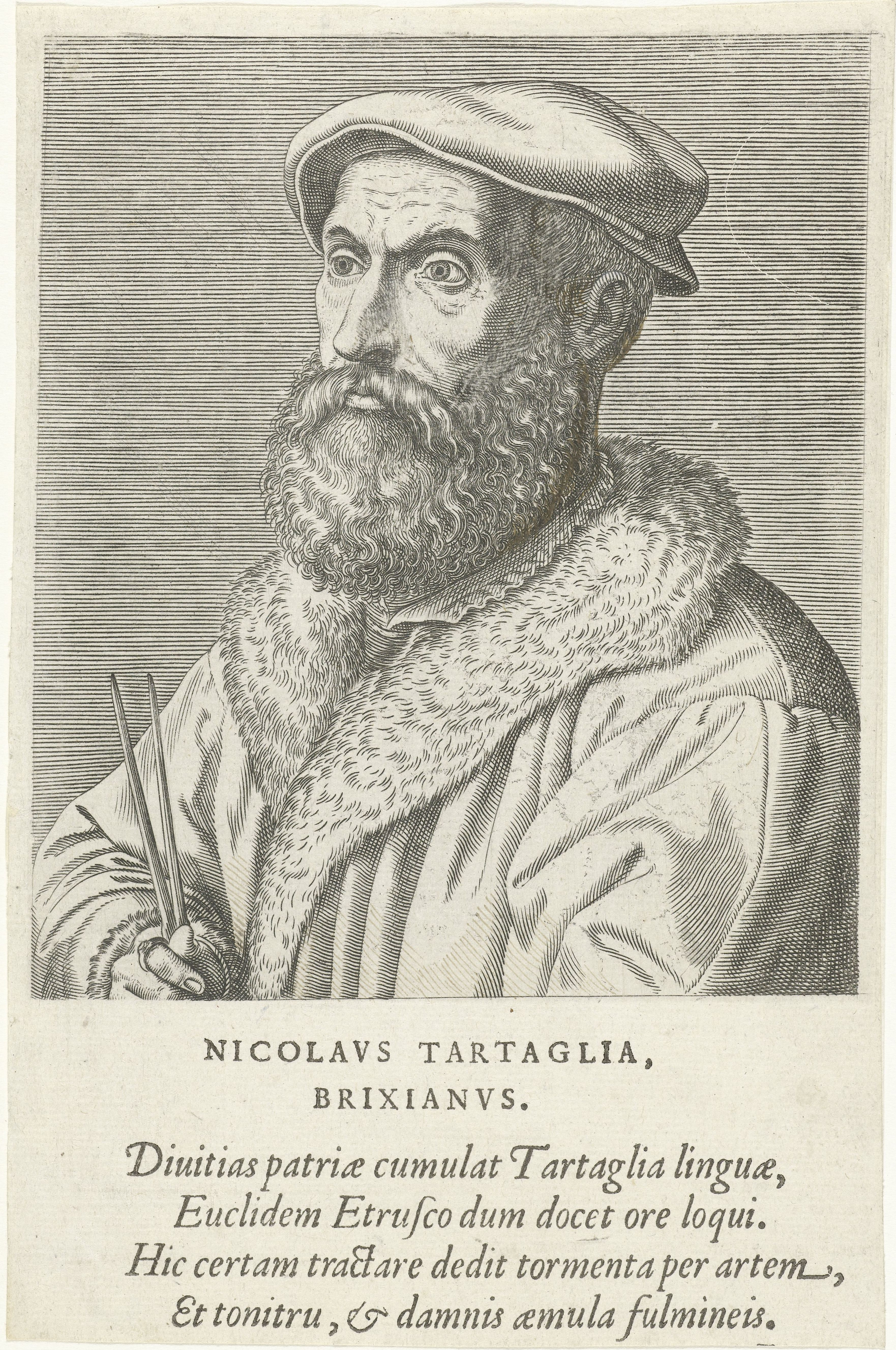
- Engraving by Philip Galle printed by Christophe Plantin with text written by Benito Arias Montano, 1572
- Born: 1499/1500; Brescia, Republic of Venice
- Died: 13 December 1557 (aged 56–58); Venice, Republic of Venice
- Known for: Cardano–Tartaglia formula Early research into ballistics Tartaglia's triangle Artillery theory

Academic background
- Academic advisor: Autodidact
- Influences: Al-Khwarizmi, Euclid

Academic work
- Discipline: Mathematics, engineering
- Notable students: Ostilio Ricci

Nicolo, known as Tartaglia (Italian: [tarˈtaʎʎa]; 1499/1500 – 13 December 1557), was an Italian mathematician, engineer (designing fortifications), a surveyor (of topography, seeking the best means of defense or offense) and a bookkeeper from the then Republic of Venice. He published many books, including the first Italian translations of Archimedes and Euclid, and an acclaimed compilation of mathematics. Tartaglia was the first to apply mathematics to the investigation of the paths of cannonballs, known as ballistics, in his Nova Scientia (A New Science, 1537); his work was later partially validated and partially superseded by Galileo's studies on falling bodies. He also published a treatise on retrieving sunken ships.

== Personal life ==
Nicolo was born in Brescia, the son of Michele, a dispatch rider who travelled to neighbouring towns to deliver mail. In 1506, Michele was murdered by robbers, and Nicolo, his two siblings, and his mother were left impoverished.
Nicolo experienced further tragedy in 1512 when King Louis XII's troops invaded Brescia during the War of the League of Cambrai against Venice. The militia of Brescia defended their city for seven days. When the French finally broke through, they took their revenge by massacring the inhabitants of Brescia. By the end of the battle, over 45,000 residents were killed. During the massacre, Nicolo and his family sought sanctuary in the local cathedral. French soldiers entered the cathedral, and a soldier sliced Nicolo's jaw and palate with a sabre and left him for dead. His mother nursed him back to health, but the young boy was left with a speech impediment, prompting the nickname "Tartaglia" ("stammerer"). After this, he would never shave and grew a beard to camouflage his scars.

His surname at birth, if any, is disputed. Some sources have him as "Niccolò Fontana", but others claim that the only support for this is a will in which he named a brother, Zuampiero Fontana, as heir, and point out that this does not imply he had the same surname.

Tartaglia's biographer Arnoldo Masotti writes that:

At the age of about fourteen, he [Tartaglia] went to a Master Francesco to learn to write the alphabet; but by the time he reached “k,” he was no longer able to pay the teacher. “From that day,” he later wrote in a moving autobiographical sketch, “I never returned to a tutor, but continued to labour by myself over the works of dead men, accompanied only by the daughter of poverty that is called industry” (Quesiti, bk. VI, question 8).

Tartaglia moved to Verona around 1517, then to Venice in 1534, a major European commercial hub and one of the great centres of the Italian renaissance at this time. Also relevant is Venice's place at the forefront of European printing culture in the sixteenth century, making early printed texts available even to poor scholars if sufficiently motivated or well-connected — Tartaglia knew of Archimedes' work on the quadrature of the parabola, for example, from Guarico's Latin edition of 1503, which he had found "in the hands of a sausage-seller in Verona in 1531" (in mano di un salzizaro in Verona, l'anno 1531 in his words). Tartaglia's mathematics is also influenced by the works of medieval Islamic scholar Muhammad ibn Musa Al-Khwarizmi from the 12th Century Latin translations becoming available in Europe.

Tartaglia eked out a living teaching practical mathematics in abacus schools and earned a penny where he could:

This remarkable man [Tartaglia] was a self-educated mathematics teacher who sold mathematical advice to gunners and architects, ten pennies for one question, and had to litigate with his customers when they gave him a worn-out cloak for his lectures on Euclid instead of the payment agreed on.

He died in Venice.

== Ballistics ==
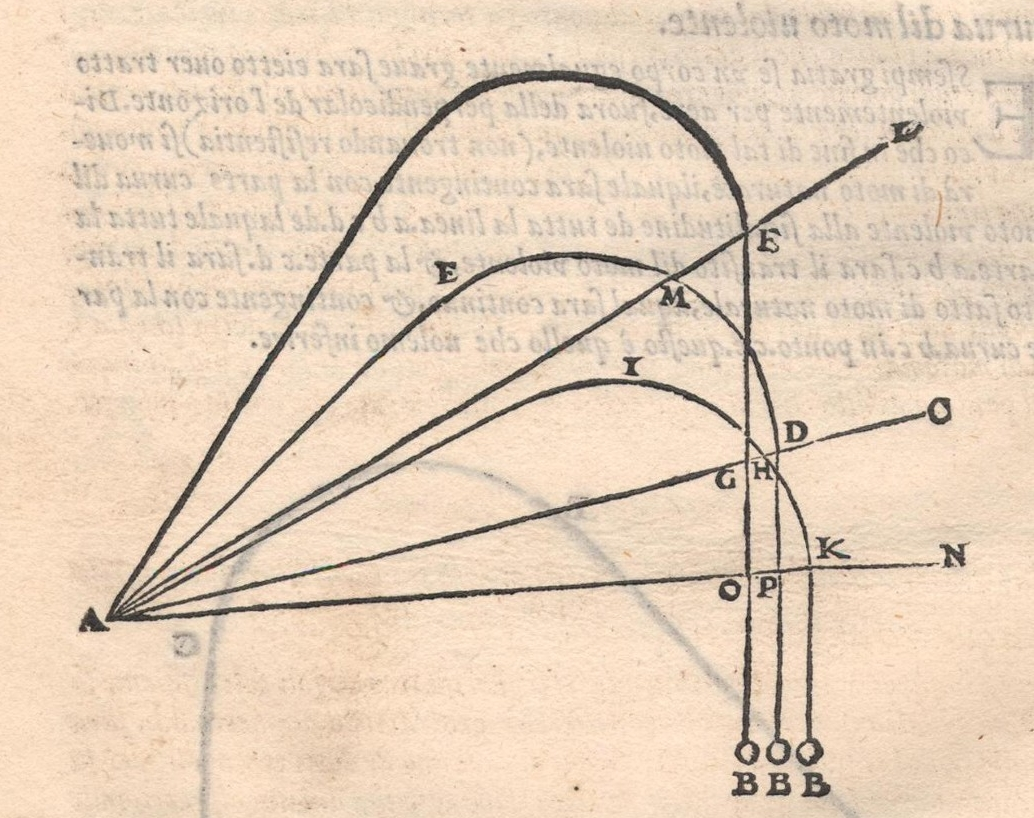
Various projectile trajectories from Nova Scientia.

Nova Scientia (1537) was Tartaglia's first published work, described by Matteo Valleriani as:

... one of the most fundamental works on mechanics of the Renaissance, indeed, the first to transform aspects of practical knowledge accumulated by the early modern artillerists into a theoretical and mathematical framework.

Then dominant Aristotelian physics preferred categories like "heavy" and "natural" and "violent" to describe motion, generally eschewing mathematical explanations. Tartaglia brought mathematical models to the fore, "eviscerat[ing] Aristotelian terms of projectile movement" in the words of Mary J. Henninger-Voss. One of his findings was that the maximum range of a projectile was achieved by directing the cannon at a 45° angle to the horizon.

Tartaglia's model for a cannonball's flight was that it proceeded from the cannon in a straight line, then after a while started to arc towards the earth along a circular path, then finally dropped in another straight line directly towards the earth. At the end of Book 2 of Nova Scientia, Tartaglia proposes to find the length of that initial rectilinear path for a projectile fired at an elevation of 45°, engaging in a Euclidean-style argument, but one with numbers attached to line segments and areas, and eventually proceeds algebraically to find the desired quantity (procederemo per algebra in his words).

Mary J. Henninger-Voss notes that "Tartaglia's work on military science had an enormous circulation throughout Europe", being a reference for common gunners into the eighteenth century, sometimes through unattributed translations. He influenced Galileo as well, who owned "richly annotated" copies of his works on ballistics as he set about solving the projectile problem once and for all.

== Translations ==
Archimedes' works began to be studied outside the universities in Tartaglia's day as exemplary of the notion that mathematics is the key to understanding physics, Federigo Commandino reflecting this notion when saying in 1558 that "with respect to geometry no one of sound mind could deny that Archimedes was some god". Tartaglia published a 71-page Latin edition of Archimedes in 1543, Opera Archimedis Syracusani philosophi et mathematici ingeniosissimi, containing Archimedes' works on the parabola, the circle, centres of gravity, and floating bodies. Guarico had published Latin editions of the first two in 1503, but the works on centres of gravity and floating bodies had not been published before. Tartaglia published Italian versions of some Archimedean texts later in life, his executor continuing to publish his translations after his death. Galileo probably learned of Archimedes' work through these widely disseminated editions.

Tartaglia's Italian edition of Euclid in 1543, Euclide Megarense philosopho, was especially significant as the first translation of the Elements into any modern European language. For two centuries, Euclid had been taught from two Latin translations taken from an Arabic source; these contained errors in Book V, the Eudoxian theory of proportion, which rendered it unusable. Tartaglia's edition was based on Zamberti's Latin translation of an uncorrupted Greek text, and rendered Book V correctly. He also wrote the first modern and useful commentary on the theory. This work went through many editions in the sixteenth century and helped diffuse knowledge of mathematics to a non-academic but increasingly well-informed literate and numerate public in Italy. The theory became an essential tool for Galileo, as it had been for Archimedes.

== General Trattato di Numeri et Misure ==
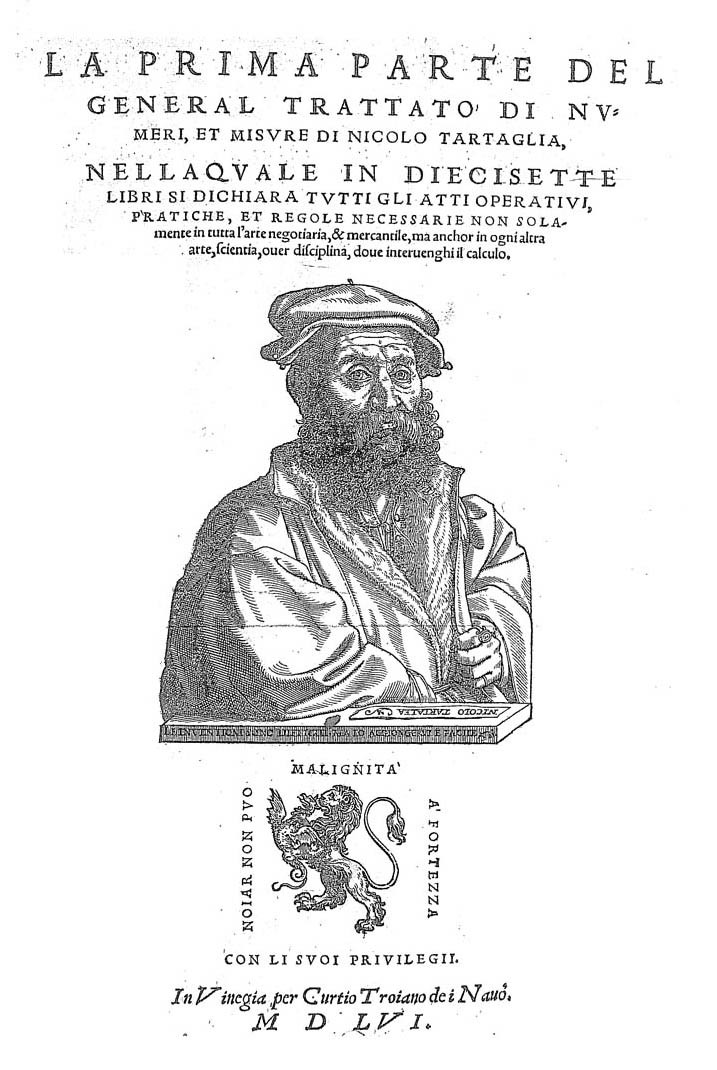
General trattato di numeri et misure, 1556

Tartaglia exemplified and eventually transcended the abaco tradition that had flourished in Italy since the twelfth century, a tradition of concrete commercial mathematics taught at abacus schools maintained by communities of merchants. Maestros d'abaco like Tartaglia taught not with the abacus but with paper-and-pen, inculcating algorithms of the type found in grade schools today.

Tartaglia's masterpiece was the General Trattato di Numeri et Misure (General Treatise on Number and Measure), a 1500-page encyclopedia in six parts written in the Venetian dialect, the first three coming out in 1556 about the time of Tartaglia's death and the last three published posthumously by his literary executor and publisher Curtio Troiano in 1560. David Eugene Smith wrote of the General Trattato that it was:

the best treatise on arithmetic that appeared in Italy in his century, containing a very full discussion of the numerical operations and the commercial rules of the Italian arithmeticians. The life of the people, the customs of the merchants, and the efforts at improving arithmetic in the 16th century are all set forth in this remarkable work.

Part I is 554 pages long and constitutes essentially commercial arithmetic, taking up such topics as basic operations with the complex currencies of the day (ducats, soldi, pizolli, and so on), exchanging currencies, calculating interest, and dividing profits into joint companies. The book is replete with worked examples with much emphasis on methods and rules (that is, algorithms), all ready to use virtually as is.

Part II takes up more general arithmetic problems, including progressions, powers, binomial expansions, Tartaglia's triangle (also known as "Pascal's triangle"), calculations with roots, and proportions / fractions.

Part IV concerns triangles, regular polygons, the Platonic solids, and Archimedean topics like the quadrature of the circle and circumscribing a cylinder around a sphere.

== Tartaglia's triangle ==
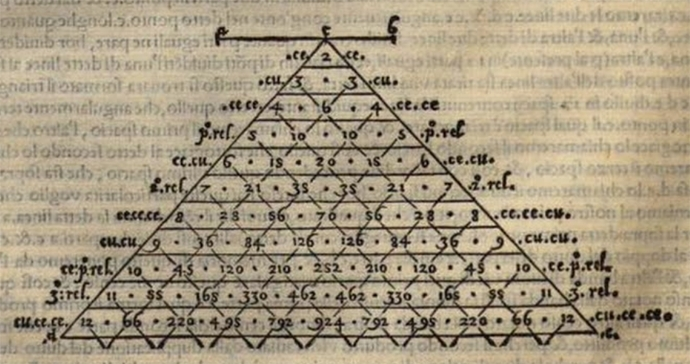
Tartaglia's triangle from General Trattato di Numeri et Misure, Part II, Book 2, p. 69.

Tartaglia was proficient with binomial expansions and included many worked examples in Part II of the General Trattato, one a detailed explanation of how to calculate the summands of $(6 + 4)^7$, including the appropriate binomial coefficients.

Tartaglia knew of Pascal's triangle one hundred years before Pascal, as shown in this image from the General Trattato. His examples are numeric, but he thinks about it geometrically, the horizontal line $ab$ at the top of the triangle being broken into two segments $ac$ and $cb$, where point $c$ is the apex of the triangle. Binomial expansions amount to taking $(ac+cb)^n$ for exponents $n = 2, 3, 4, \cdots$ as you go down the triangle. The symbols along the outside represent powers at this early stage of algebraic notation: $ce = 2, cu = 3, ce.ce = 4$, and so on. He writes explicitly about the additive formation rule, that (for example) the adjacent 15 and 20 in the fifth row add up to 35, which appears beneath them in the sixth row.

== Solution to cubic equations ==
Tartaglia is perhaps best known today for his conflicts with Gerolamo Cardano. In 1539, Cardano cajoled Tartaglia into revealing his solution to the cubic equations by promising not to publish them. Tartaglia divulged the secrets of the solutions of three different forms of the cubic equation in verse. Several years later, Cardano happened to see unpublished work by Scipione del Ferro who independently came up with the same solution as Tartaglia. (Tartaglia had previously been challenged by del Ferro's student Fiore, which made Tartaglia aware that a solution existed.)

As the unpublished work was dated before Tartaglia's, Cardano decided his promise could be broken and included Tartaglia's solution in his next publication. Even though Cardano credited his discovery, Tartaglia was extremely upset, and a famous public challenge match resulted between himself and Cardano's student, Ludovico Ferrari. Widespread stories that Tartaglia devoted the rest of his life to ruining Cardano, however, appear to be completely fabricated. Mathematical historians now credit both Cardano and Tartaglia with the formula to solve cubic equations, referring to it as the "Cardano–Tartaglia formula".

== Volume of a tetrahedron ==
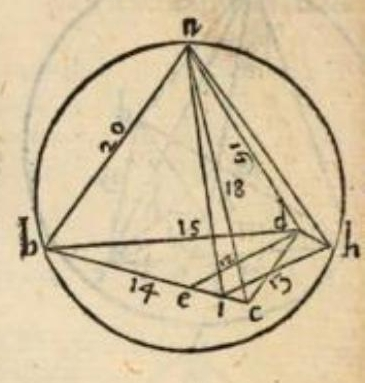
13-14-15-20-18-16 pyramid from the General Trattato di Numeri et Misure, Part IV, Book 2, p. 35.

Tartaglia was a prodigious calculator and master of solid geometry. In Part IV of the General Trattato he shows by example how to calculate the height of a pyramid on a triangular base, that is, an irregular tetrahedron.

The base of the pyramid is a 13-14-15 triangle bcd, and the edges rising to the apex a from points b, c, and d have respective lengths 20, 18, and 16. The base triangle bcd partitions into 5-12-13 and 9-12-15 triangles by dropping the perpendicular from point d to side bc. He proceeds to erect a triangle in the plane perpendicular to line bc through the pyramid's apex, point a, calculating all three sides of this triangle and noting that its height is the height of the pyramid. At the last step, he applies what amounts to this formula for the height h of a triangle in terms of its sides p, q, r (the height from side p to its opposite vertex):

$$h^2 = r^2 - \left(\frac{p^2 + r^2 - q^2}{2p}\right)^2,$$

a formula deriving from the law of cosines (not that he cites any justification in this section of the General Trattato).

Tartaglia drops a digit early in the calculation, taking 305 31/49 as 305 3/49, but his method is sound. The final (correct) answer is:

$$\text{height of pyramid} = \sqrt{240 \tfrac{615}{3136}}.$$

The volume of the pyramid is easily obtained from this, though Tartaglia does not give it:

$$\begin{align}
V &= \tfrac13 \times \text{base} \times \text{height} \\
&= \tfrac13 \times \text{Area} (\triangle bcd) \times \text{height} \\
&= \tfrac13 \times 84 \times \sqrt{240 \tfrac{615}{3136}} \\
&\approx 433.9513222
\end{align}$$

Simon Stevin invented decimal fractions later in the sixteenth century, so the approximation would have been foreign to Tartaglia, who always used fractions. His approach is in some ways a modern one, suggesting by example an algorithm for calculating the height of irregular tetrahedra, but (as usual) he gives no explicit general formula.

== Works ==
- Tartaglia, Niccolò, General Trattato di Numeri et Misure, Part I (Venice, 1556)
- Tartaglia, Niccolò, General Trattato di Numeri et Misure, Part II (Venice, 1556)
- Tartaglia, Niccolò, General Trattato di Numeri et Misure, Part III (Venice, 1556)
- Tartaglia, Niccolò, General Trattato di Numeri et Misure, Part IV (Venice, 1560)
- Tartaglia, Niccolò, General Trattato di Numeri et Misure, Part V (Venice, 1560)
- Tartaglia, Niccolò, General Trattato di Numeri et Misure, Part VI (Venice, 1560)

== Sources ==
- Chisholm, Hugh, ed. (1911). "Tartaglia, Niccolò" . Encyclopædia Britannica. Vol. 26 (11th ed.). Cambridge University Press.
- Clagett, Marshall (1982). "William of Moerbeke: Translator of Archimedes". Proceedings of the American Philosophical Society. 126 (5): 356–366..
- Henninger-Voss, Mary J. (July 2002). "How the 'New Science' of Cannons Shook up the Aristotelian Cosmos". Journal of the History of Ideas. 63 (3): 371–397. doi:10.1353/jhi.2002.0029. S2CID 170464547.
- Herbermann, Charles, ed. (1913). "Nicolò Tartaglia" . Catholic Encyclopedia. New York: Robert Appleton Company.
- Charles Hutton (1815). "Tartaglia or Tartaglia (Nicholas)". A philosophical and mathematical dictionary. Printed for the author. p. 482.
- Katz, Victor J. (1998), A History of Mathematics: An Introduction (2nd ed.), Reading: Addison Wesley Longman, ISBN 0-321-01618-1.
- Malet, Antoni (2012). "Euclid's Swan Song: Euclid's Elements in Early Modern Europe". In Olmos, Paula (ed.). Greek Science in the Long Run: Essays on the Greek Scientific Tradition (4th c. BCE-17th c. CE). Cambridge Scholars Publishing. pp. 205–234. ISBN 978-1-4438-3775-0..
- Masotti, Arnoldo (1970). "Niccolò Tartaglia". In Gillispie, Charles (ed.). Dictionary of Scientific Biography. New York: Scribner & American Council of Learned Societies.
- Smith, D.E. (1958), History of Mathematics, vol. I, New York: Dover Publications, ISBN 0-486-20429-4.
- Strathern, Paul (2013), Venetians, New York, NY: Pegasus Books.
- Tartaglia, Niccolò (1543). Opera Archimedis Syracusani philosophi et mathematici ingeniosissimi. Venice.
- Tartaglia, Niccolò (1543). Euclide Megarense philosopho. Venice.
- Tartaglia, Niccolò (1556–1560), General Trattato di Numeri et Misure, Venice: Curtio Troiano.
- Valleriani, Matteo (2013), Metallurgy, Ballistics and Epistemic Instruments: The Nova Scientia of Nicolò Tartaglia, Berlin: Edition Open Access / Max Planck Research Library, ISBN 978-3-8442-5258-3.
- Zilsel, Edgar (2000), Raven, Diederick; Krohn, Wolfgang; Cohen, Robert S. (eds.), The Social Origins of Modern Science, Springer Netherlands, ISBN 0-7923-6457-0.
