= Saint John the Baptist as a Boy (Andrea del Sarto) =

Painting by Andrea del Sarto

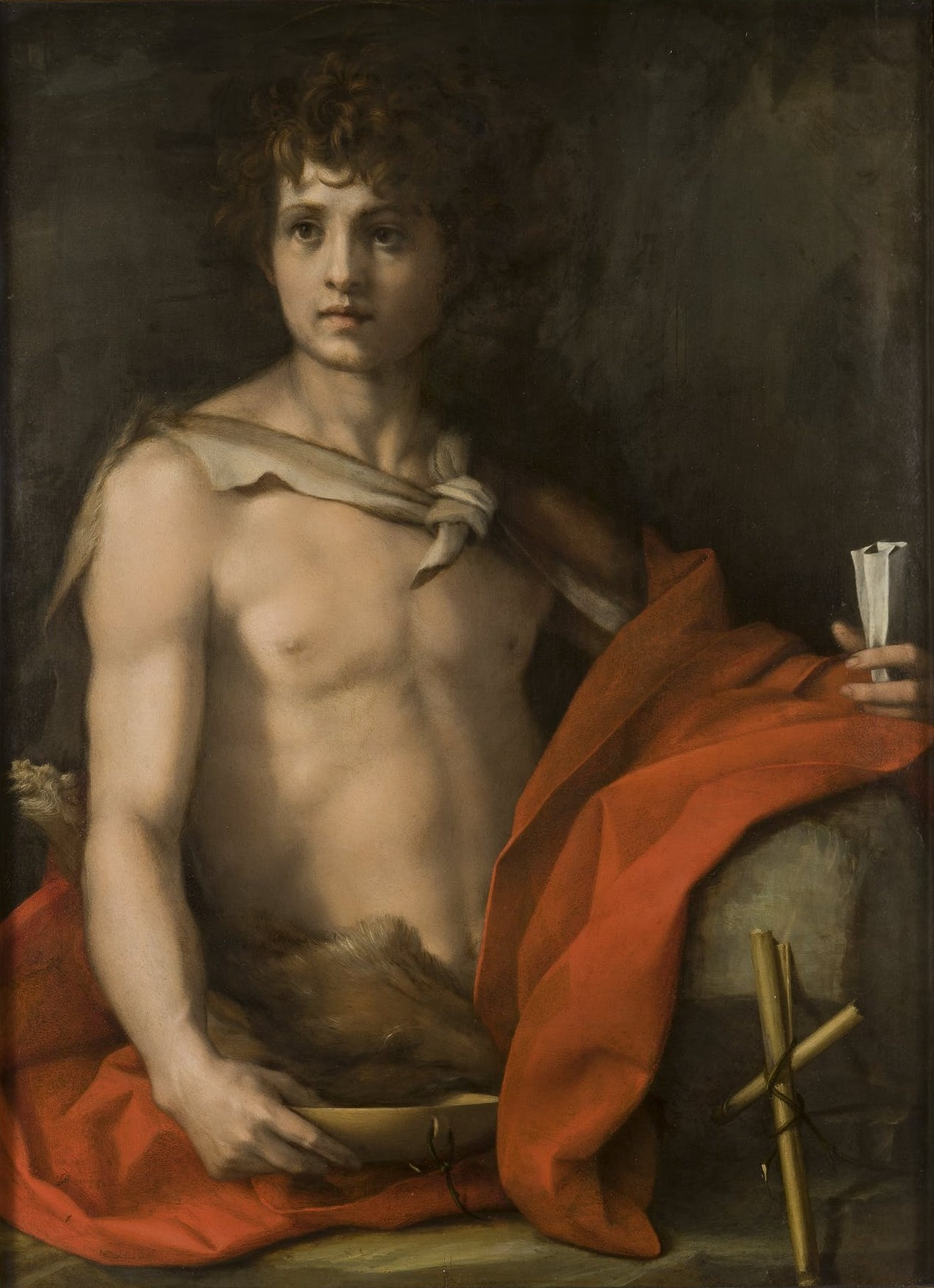
Saint John the Baptist as a Boy (c. 1525) by Andrea del Sarto

Saint John the Baptist as a Boy is an oil-on-panel painting by the Italian Renaissance artist Andrea del Sarto, executed c. 1525, now in the Palatine Gallery of the Palazzo Pitti in Florence.

Vasari's Lives of the Artists mentions two works by Andrea del Sarto showing half-length figures of John the Baptist as a boy. This is the first of the two, produced for Giovan Maria Benintendi. The second was intended for the Grand Master of France, but was later sold to Ottaviano de' Medici instead and may be the one now in the Worcester Art Museum.

The Palatine Gallery work was the central one in the decoration of the antechamber in the Palazzo Benintendi. The other works in the antechamber were Pontormo's Adoration of the Magi, Franciabigio's Bathsheba Bathing (Gemäldegalerie, Dresden) and Bacchiacca's Legend of the Dead King's Son (Gemäldegalerie, Dresden) and Baptism of Christ (Gemäldegalerie, Berlin).

The work was later given to Cosimo I by Giovanni Maria Benintendi. It is recorded as hanging in the Guardaroba Medicea in 1553, along with its donor's name. It appears in a Medici inventory of 1589 and hung in the Palatine Gallery's Jupiter room from at least 1828 and possibly earlier.

== Description and style ==
Against a dark background, the Baptist stands out half-length like a teenager in a heroic pose, modeled on the example of classical sculptures. The face, characterized as a portrait, sends an intense gaze towards the left as in Michelangelo's David, and anticipating the figurations of Caravaggio. The eyes are expressive, the hair capriciously shaggy.

The saint has the camel skin of his hermitage tied to his shoulder, which falls at the waist leaving his chest and arms uncovered. In his hand he holds the basin with which he imparted the baptism and a rolled up cartouche (an allusion to his typical message "Ecce Agnus Dei"), while the simple cross made of tied reeds is placed in foreground, lower right. A red drape intensely enlivens the colors.
