= Cigoli =

Italian painter and architect (1559–1613)

Ludovico Cigoli
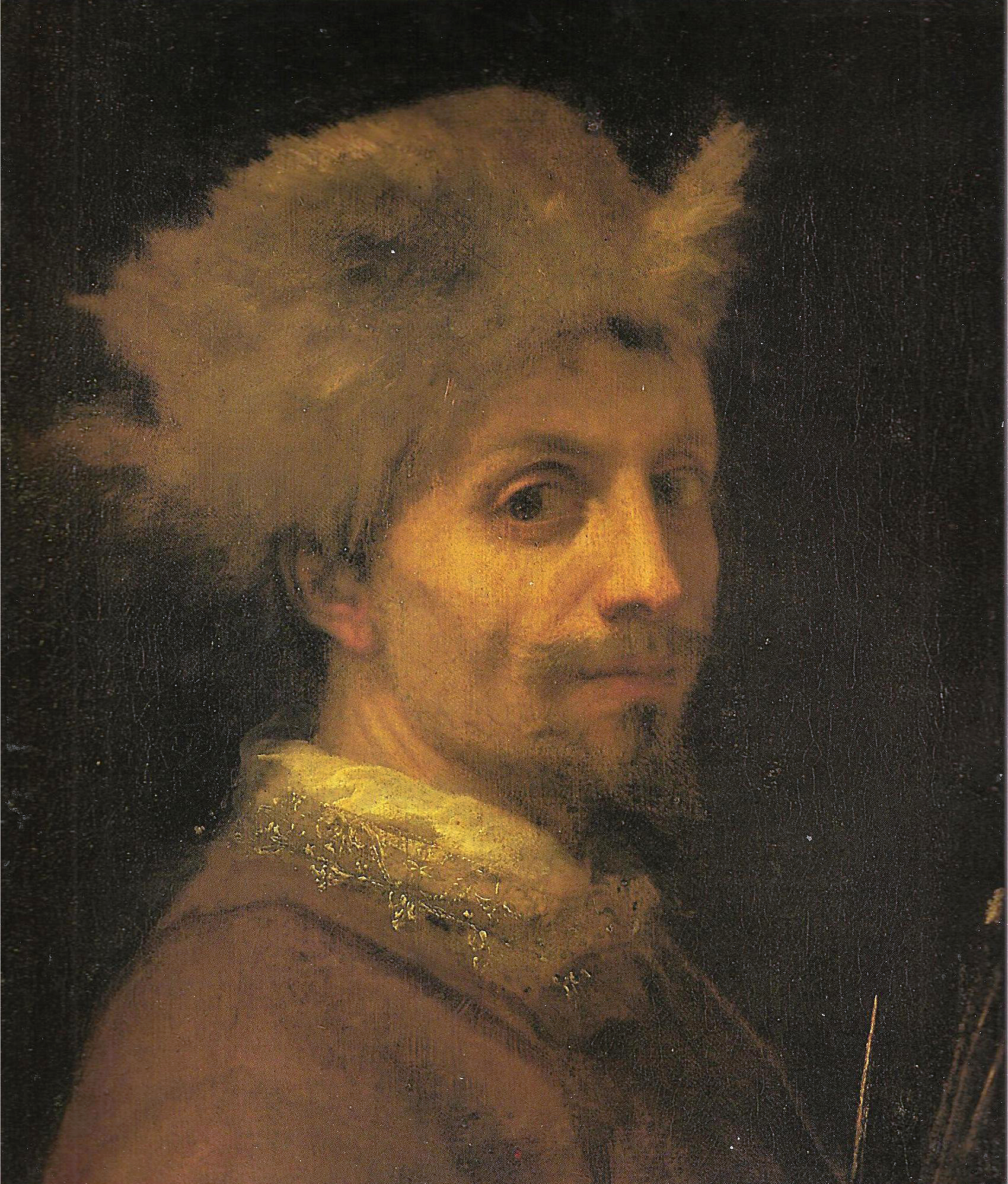
- Self-portrait, Florence, Uffizi
- Born: Ludovico Cardi; 21 September 1559; Cigoli, San Miniato, Duchy of Florence
- Died: 8 June 1613 (aged 53); Rome, Papal States
- Education: Alessandro Allori; Bernardo Buontalenti; Santi di Tito
- Known for: Painting
- Movement: Mannerism; Baroque
- Patrons: House of Medici

Lodovico or Ludovico Cardi (21 September 1559 – 8 June 1613), also known as Cigoli, was an Italian painter and architect of the late Mannerist and early Baroque period. Influenced by the most prominent of the "Counter-Maniera" painters, Santi di Tito and Barocci, Cigoli shed the shackles of mannerism and infused his later paintings with an expressionism often lacking from 16th-century Florentine painting.

== Biography ==
=== Training and early works ===
Lodovico Cardi was born at Villa Castelvecchio in Cigoli, near San Miniato – hence the name by which he is commonly known. He came from a prominent local family who claimed descent from the noble Gualandi family of Pisa. In 1568 he was sent to Florence to study the humanities, but upon demonstrating his artistic talent, he was permitted to pursue a career in painting. Initially, Cigoli trained in Florence under the fervid mannerist Alessandro Allori, and studied the works of Michelangelo, Correggio, Andrea del Sarto and Pontormo. In 1578, he matriculated in the Accademia delle Arti del Disegno in Florence. The painting he produced for his admission, Cain and Abel (untraced), was deemed the finest of all the submissions.

A short time later, Cigoli fell ill with a disease attributed to over-exposure to corpses while studying anatomy in Allori’s workshop. He left Florence for his native Cigoli, where he stayed for two or three years to recover. Around 1582, the painter and architect Bernardo Buontalenti invited Cigoli back to Florence to work in his studio. Under Buontalenti, Cigoli learned architecture, perspective and scenography. He collaborated with Buontalenti on the design of the Uffizi Tribuna and the organisation of court festivals and public processions. To further his training in painting, he studied under the Counter-Maniera painter Santi di Tito, absorbing his naturalistic tendencies and precise draftsmanship. Alongside his close friend, Gregorio Pagani, he founded an independent academy in the studio of Girolamo Macchietti, where they practised drawing from life and sought a more naturalistic approach to colour.

Thanks to Buontalenti, Cigoli gained access to the Medici court. He became acquainted with the Grand Duke Francesco I de' Medici and the court tutor, Ostilio Ricci, who taught him perspective and mathematics. Numerous payment records and letters held in the State Archives of Florence attest to the many works and services that Cigoli carried out for the House of Medici. His first commissions included several paintings for the wedding of Grand Duke Ferdinando to Christina of Lorraine in 1589. Cigoli also painted frescoes in the Villa La Petraia, and a Resurrection for a chapel in the Palazzo Pitti. Between 1590 and 1603, Cigoli was one of the leading painters working in Florence. He ran a large workshop that included his friends Andrea Commodi and Giulio Parigi, Giovanni Biliverti and Cristofano Allori. Cigoli was also highly regarded as a poet, orator and musician. He became a member Accademia Fiorentina in 1597 and the Accademia della Crusca in 1603 and was a friend of the antiquarian and scientist Girolamo Mercuriale, the historian Bernardo Davanzati, and the poet Michelangelo Buonarroti the Younger.

=== Mature career ===
Ecce homo, 1607, Palatine Gallery, Palazzo Pitti, Florence

Between 1604 and 1613, Cigoli produced his most important works in Florence and Rome, where he settled in April 1604 to paint St. Peter Healing the Crippled Man (destr.), one of six paintings intended for the side altars of St. Peter's Basilica, a prestigious commission obtained through the offices of Ferdinando I de' Medici. The prominent 17th-century painter, Andrea Sacchi, rated Cigoli's St. Peter Healing the Crippled Man as the third most beautiful painting in Rome, immediately after Raphael's Transfiguration and Domenichino's The Last Communion of St. Jerome. Cigoli played an important role in the development High Baroque painting in Rome, and became closely associated with Annibale Carracci and Caravaggio. In 1607, he painted an Ecce homo for the Roman patron Massimo Massimi (Florence, Palazzo Pitti), widely considered his best painting. According to Cigoli's biographer, Giambatista Cardi, Massimi also commissioned two other prominent contemporary painters, Passignano and Caravaggio, to provide canvases on the same theme, without informing the artists of the multiple commissions. Massimi preferred Cigoli's version to Caravaggio's, which strained the relationship between the two artists. During the French occupation of Tuscany, the painting was taken by Napoleon to the Louvre and only returned to Florence after the fall of the First French Empire in 1815.

Other important pictures from this period are an unfinished Burial of St. Paul in the church of San Paolo fuori le Mura, and a Story of Psyche in a fresco incorporated in the decorative scheme of the Villa Borghese; a Martyrdom of Stephen, which earned him the name of the "Florentine Correggio", and a Stigmata of St. Francis at Florence. Cigoli also oversaw the renovation work at the Church of San Gaggio, Florence, for which he painted the Disputation of St. Catherine and the altarpiece depicting the Mystic Marriage of St. Catherine. During this decade, he received preferential treatment by the Medici, which stirred the jealousy of his rivals. In Rome, he associated with Monsignor Giovanni Battista Agucchi, the Sienese physician and connoisseur Giulio Mancini, and Cardinals Del Monte and Barberini, and became a close friend of Galileo and a supporter of the newborn Accademia dei Lincei. Galileo regarded Cigoli as the greatest painter of the age and the two corresponded about scientific and artistic topics. For Galileo, Cigoli systematically recorded solar activity, using a projection method taught to him by his pupil, Sigismondo Coccapani. Following his election to the Accademia di San Luca in 1604, Cigoli delivered a well-received speech (which has not survived), in which he stressed the importance that artists possess a solid foundation in disegno (drawing).

=== Later life and legacy ===
The Immaculate Conception, 1612, Pauline Chapel, Santa Maria Maggiore

Between 1610 and October 1612 Cigoli painted a last fresco in the dome of the Pauline Chapel of the church of Santa Maria Maggiore in Rome, depicting the Madonna standing upon a pockmarked lunar orb. This is the first extant example of Galileo's discoveries about the physical nature of the Moon (as he himself drew it in his 1610 treatise Sidereus Nuncius), having penetrated the visual arts practice of his day. Until this image, the Moon in pictures of the Virgin had always been mythical and smooth, perfectly spherical as described by Platonic and Ptolemaic tradition.

In 1613, shortly before his death, Cigoli was made a Knight of Malta at the request of Pope Paul V. Cigoli died in Rome on 8 June 1613, aged 53 and was buried in the church of San Giovanni dei Fiorentini; his remains were transferred to Florence in 1644 and buried in the church of San Gaetano in Via de' Tornabuoni. Cigoli's pupils include Cristofano Allori (1577–1621), the Flemish Giovanni Biliverti (1576–1644), Domenico Fetti, Giovanni Antonio Lelli, Aurelio Lomi, Gregorio Pagani, and Andrea Commodi (1560–1638). Cigoli enjoyed great fame and prestige during his lifetime. Even before he left Florence, he was considered one of the finest painters in the city. When he arrived in Rome in 1604, he was welcomed by the Florentine ambassador and accommodated in the residences of the Medici family and of Virginio Orsini, the nephew of Ferdinando I de' Medici. In Baldinucci's Notizie de' Professori del Disegno, Cigoli is the only artist, alongside Michelangelo, to be given the unique title of 'Divine'.

== Selected Works ==
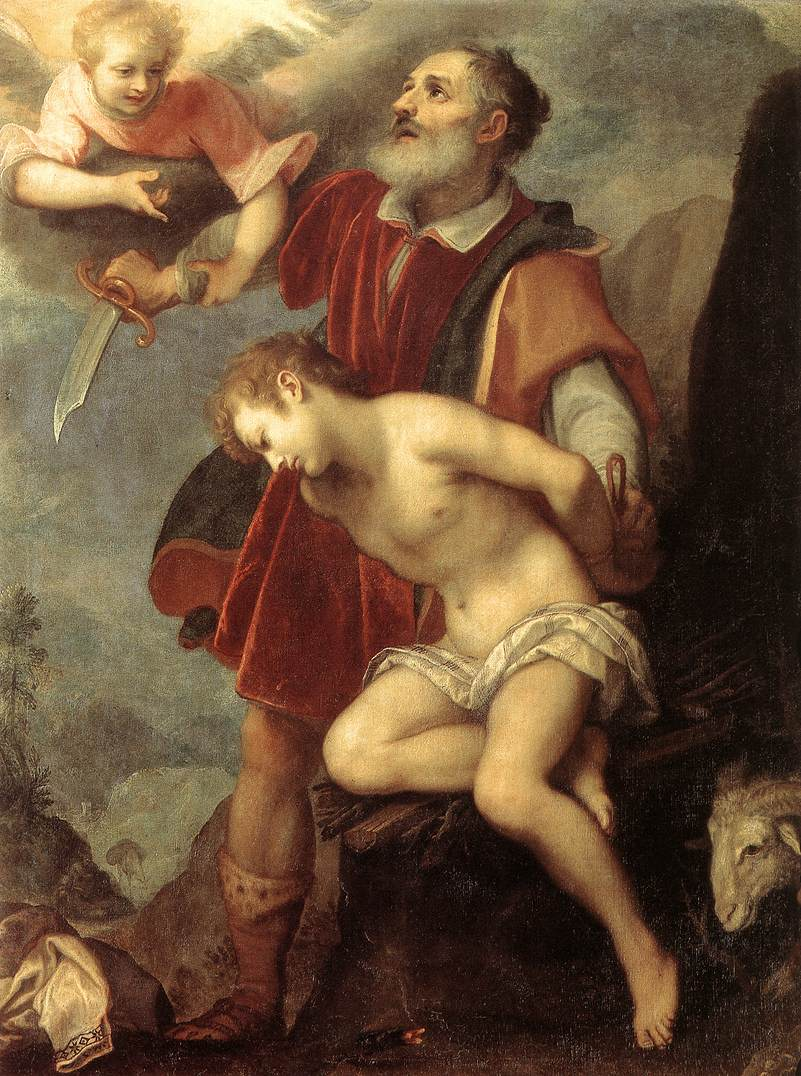
The Sacrifice of Isaac, c. 1607, Palazzo Pitti, Florence

- The Deposition of Christ (1579), Uffizi, Florence
- Christ in the Limbo (1581). Fresco in the Chiostro Grande of Santa Maria Novella, Florence;
- The Circumcision of Christ (c. 1590), Hermitage Museum, Saint Petersburg;
- Saint Francis Receives the Stigmata (1596), Uffizi, Florence
- St. Francis (1597–99), Hermitage Museum, Saint Petersburg;
- The Adoration of the Shepherds with St. Catherine of Alexandria (1599), Metropolitan Museum of Art, New York;
- Pietà (c. 1599), Campion Hall, Oxford;
- The Lamentation of Christ (1599), Kunsthistorisches Museum, Vienna;
- The Flight into Egypt (late 16th century), Louvre, Paris;
- The Virgin Mary (c. 1599-1600), Musée Fesch, Ajaccio;
- Portrait of Cosimo I de' Medici (1600), Palazzo Medici Riccardi, Florence;
- St. James the Less (c. 1600), Staatsgalerie Stuttgart
- St. Jerome (c. 1603), Palazzo Giuli Rosselmini Gualandi, Pisa;
- The Adoration of the Magi (1605), Stourhead, Stourton, Wiltshire;
- The Sacrifice of Isaac, c. 1607, Palazzo Pitti, Florence;
- Ecce homo, 1607, Palatine Gallery, Palazzo Pitti, Florence;
- Joseph and Potiphar's Wife (1610), Galleria Borghese, Rome;
- The Immaculate Conception (1612). Fresco on the dome of the Pauline Chapel in Santa Maria Maggiore, Rome.
The Deposition of Christ, Uffizi, Florence

The Lamentation of Christ, Kunsthistorisches Museum, Vienna

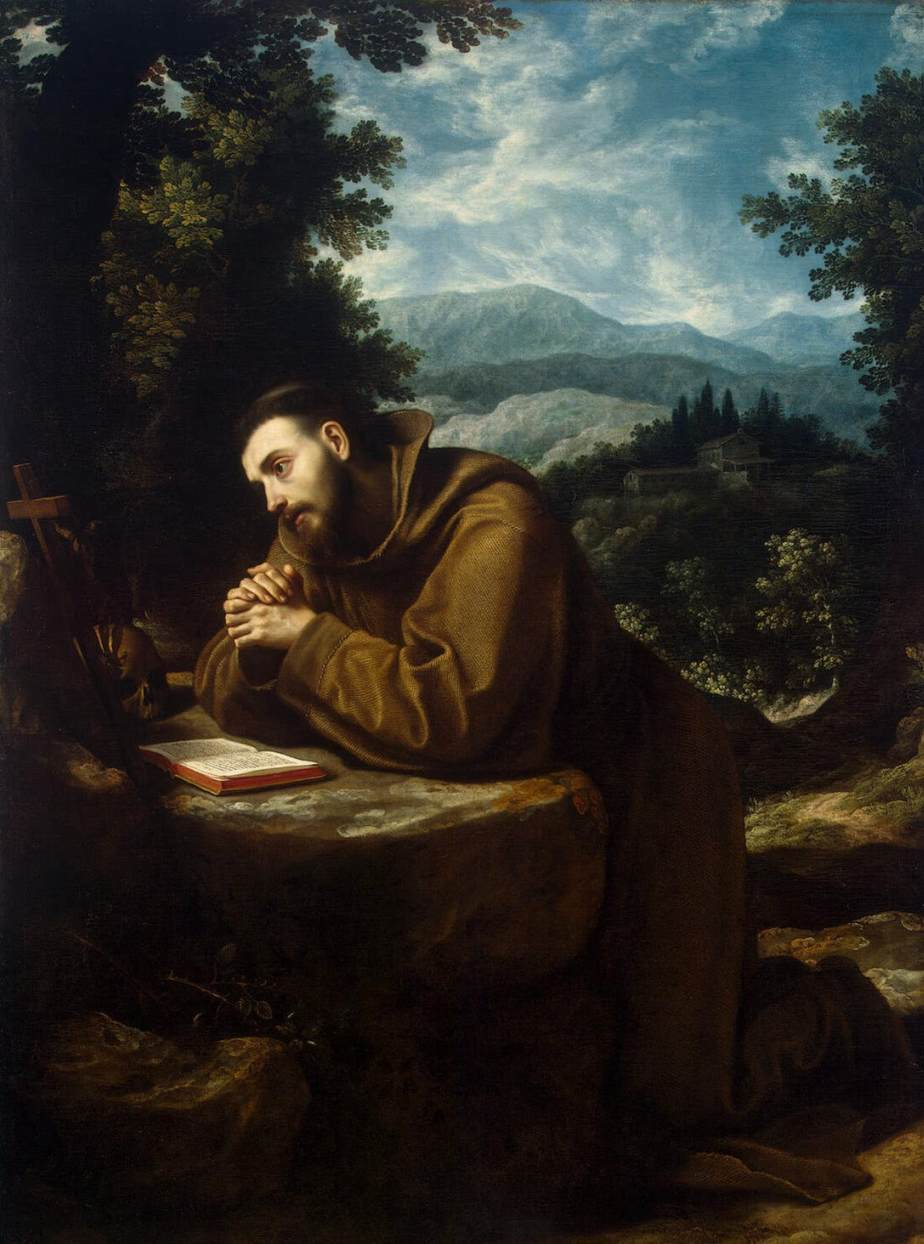
St. Francis, Hermitage Museum, Saint Petersburg

The Circumcision of Christ, Hermitage Museum, Saint Petersburg

The Adoration of the Shepherds with St. Catherine of Alexandria, Metropolitan Museum of Art, New York

Pietà, Campion Hall, Oxford

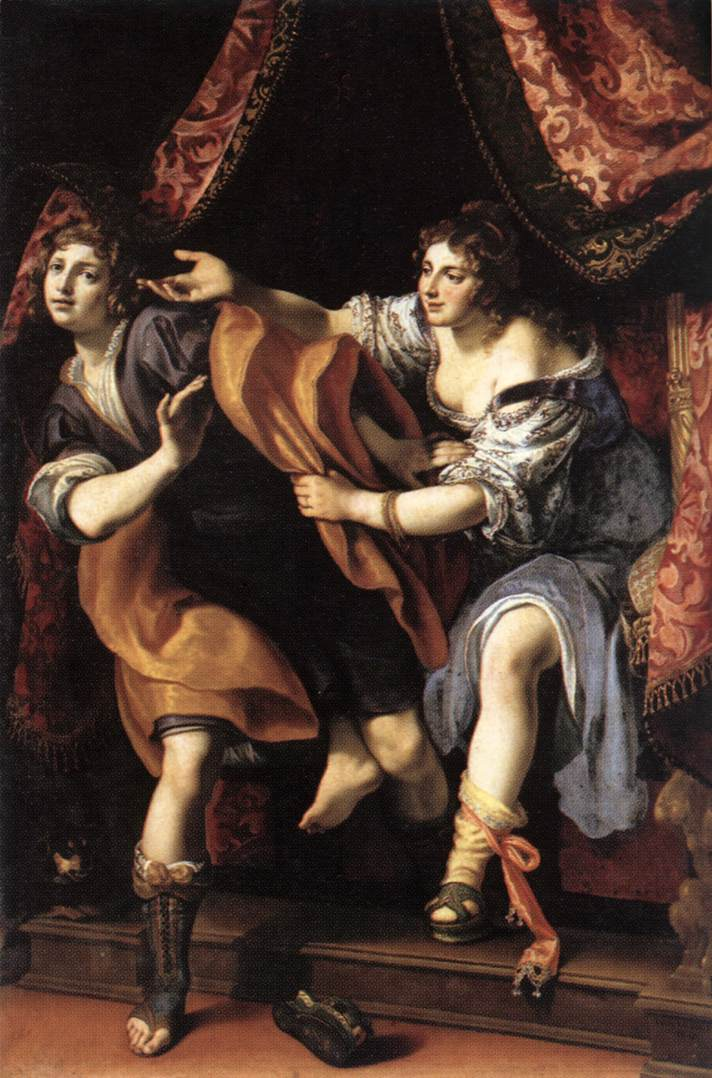
Joseph and Potiphar's Wife, Galleria Borghese, Rome

The Virgin Mary, Musée Fesch, Ajaccio

== See also ==
- Ostilio Ricci

== Sources ==
- Chappell, Miles L. (1975). "Cigoli, Galileo and Invidia". The Art Bulletin. 57 (1): 91–98. doi:10.2307/3049340.
- Wittkower, Rudolf (1993). Art and Architecture Italy, 1600-1750. Pelican History of Art. Penguin Books Ltd. pp. 97–98.
- Chappell, Miles L. (1976). "CARDI, Lodovico, detto il Cigoli". Dizionario Biografico degli Italiani (in Italian). Vol. 19: Cappi–Cardona. Rome: Institute of the Italian Encyclopaedia. ISBN 978-88-12-00032-6.
- Booth, Sara Elizabeth; Van Helden, Albert (2001). "The Virgin and the Telescope: The Moons of Cigoli and Galileo". Science in Context. 14: 193–216. doi:10.1017/S0269889701000345.
- Chappell, Miles L. (2003). "Cigoli, Lodovico". Grove Art Online. Oxford: Oxford University Press. doi:10.1093/gao/9781884446054.article.T017762.
