= Saint John the Baptist as a Boy (Raphael) =

Painting by Raphael

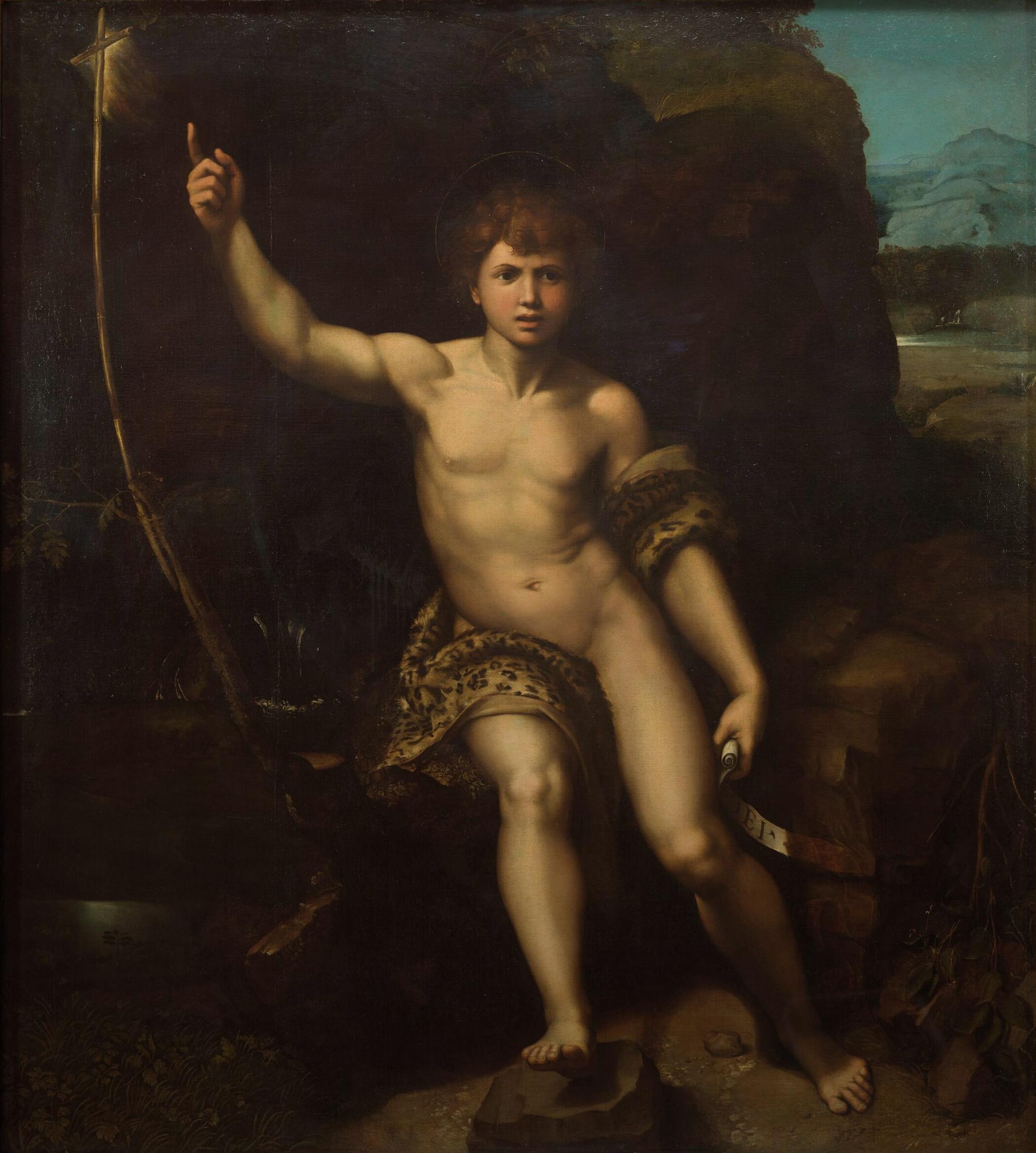
- Artist: Workshop of Raphael
- Year: c. 1518–1519
- Medium: Oil on canvas
- Dimensions: 147 cm × 135 cm (58 in × 53 in)
- Location: Uffizi, Florence

Saint John the Baptist as a Boy is a c. 1518-1519 oil on canvas painting by the studio of Raphael, now in the Uffizi in Florence.

== History ==
The painting is usually identified with the work mentioned in Giorgio Vasari's Lives of the Artists as produced for cardinal Jacopo Berengario da Carpi. Other sources argue it was commissioned by Pompeo Colonna when he was made a cardinal by Pope Leo X. In that case, Saint John would have been chosen in homage to Leo as the patron saint of his home city of Florence.

The painting was recorded in the Uffizi in 1589, then in the Palazzo Pitti and the Galleria dell'Accademia before returning to the Uffizi in recent years in its Tribuna. Despite the work's past celebrity, proven by the numerous prints made of it, it is today attributed to the workshop of Raphael.

== Description ==
A young Saint John the Baptist is traditionally represented as wearing only skins, often camel. In this case, he wears an exotic spotted fur wrapped around his body. Seated on a rock, he makes a gesture typical of Jesus to point to a cross on the left side of the painting. His athletic form and the shape of his body is derived from the Ignudi (lit. 'nude figures') of Michelangelo on the Sistine Chapel. The painting uses an incidental light source and attempts to give relief to the illusory form of the figure, visible in the figure's feet.
