= Bojo =

Bojo, Bo Jo, or variants, may refer to:

== People ==
- Bojo Jinul (1158–1210), 12th century Korean monk
- Bojo Molina (born 1973), Filipino actor
- Boris Johnson (born 1964), Prime Minister of the United Kingdom (2019–2022), sometimes nicknamed "BoJo"
- Fujiwara no Morosuke (909–960), Japanese statesman, known as Minister of the Right Bojo (Bōjō-udaijin)
- Wakamatsu Shizuko (1864–1896), Japanese novelist; pen name "Bojo"

=== Surnamed Bojo ===
- Bojo Nobuko (坊城伸子; 1830–1850), concubine-wife of Emperor Kōmei of Japan
- Major Bojo, a Japanese commander during the Hsinchu Campaign
- Petar Bojo (born 1998), Croatian soccer player

=== Fictional characters ===
- Bojo, a character from Stitch!; see List of Stitch! episodes
- Boswell Johnson "Bo Jo" Jones, titular character from the 1967 novel Mr and Mrs Bo Jo Jones and its 1971 film adaptation
- Rodney 'Bo-Jo' Brown, a character from the 1941 film H. M. Pulham, Esq.

== Places ==
- Bijo, Azerbaijan, also spelled as "Bojo"
- Bojo, one of the Batu Islands of Indonesia
- Bōjō Station, a railway station in Nara Prefecture, Japan
- Bojo (barangay), a village in Aloguinsan in the Philippines
- Bojo River, a river in Aloguinsan in the Philippines

== Other uses ==
- "Bojo" (song), a song by Pink Lady; see Live in Budoukan
- "Bojo" (episode), a 2008 season 1 TV episode of Stitch!; see List of Stitch! episodes
- Bojo, a fictional slang term in the 1989 film Back to the Future Part II
- Bojangles', abbreviated Bojo, an affectionate term of endearment for the fast-food restaurant serving fried chicken and biscuits

== See also ==
- Boggio, a surname (see)
- Bo (disambiguation)
- Jo (disambiguation)
