= Resolvent =

In mathematics, resolvent meaning "that which resolves" may refer to:

- Resolvent formalism in operator theory
- Resolvent set in operator theory, the set of points where an operator is "well-behaved"
- Feller process § Resolvent in probability theory
- Resolvent (Galois theory) of an equation for a permutation group, in particular:
  - Resolvent quadratic of a cubic equation
  - Resolvent cubic of a quartic equation

In logic:

- Resolvent (logic), the clause produced by a resolution
- In the consensus theorem, the term produced by a consensus in Boolean logic
