= Boggio =

Boggio is a surname. Notable people with the name include:

- Alberto Boggio (born 1969), Argentine footballer
- Carlo Boggio (1931–2017), Italian politician
- Emilio Boggio (1857–1920), Italian-Venezuelan pioneering impressionist painter
- Jim Boggio (1939–1996), American accordionist
- Luciano Boggio (born 1999), Uruguayan footballer
- Maricla Boggio (1937–2026), Italian writer, playwright, essayist, and journalist
- Norberto Boggio (1931–2021), Argentine football forward
- Tommaso Boggio (1877–1963), Italian mathematician

== See also ==
- Boggio's formula, mathematical field of potential theory
