= Roberto Marcolongo =

Italian mathematician (1862–1943)

Roberto Marcolongo (August 28, 1862 in Rome – May 16, 1943 in Rome) was an Italian mathematician, known for his research in vector calculus and theoretical physics.

== Biography ==
Marcolongo graduated in 1886, and later he was an assistant of Valentino Cerruti in Rome. In 1895 he became professor of rational mechanics at the University of Messina. In 1908 he moved to the University of Naples, where he remained until retirement in 1935.

He worked on vector calculus together with Cesare Burali-Forti, which was then known as "Italian notation". In 1906 he wrote an early work which used the four-dimensional formalism to account for relativistic invariance under Lorentz transformations.

In 1921 he published to Messina one of the first treaties on the special relativity and general, where he used the absolute differential calculus without coordinates, developed with Burali-Forti, as opposed to the absolute differential calculus with coordinates of Tullio Levi-Civita and Gregorio Ricci-Curbastro.

He was a member of the Accademia dei Lincei and other Italian academies.

== Works ==
- Teoria matematica dello equilibrio dei corpi elastici (Milano: U. Hoepli, 1904)
- Meccanica razionale (Milano: U. Hoepli, 1905)
- Elementi di Calcolo vettoriale con numerose Applicazioni (with Burali-Forti) (Bologna, Nicola Zanichelli, 1909) 2nd ed. 1920.
- Omografie vettoriali con Applicazioni (with Burali-Forti) (Torino, G. B. Petrini, 1909)
- Analyse vectorielle générale: Transformations linéaires (with Cesare Burali-Forti, translated into French by Paul Baridon) (Pavia: Mattei & C., 1913)
- Analyse vectorielle générale: Applications à la mécanique et à la physique (in French, with Cesare Burali-Forti and Tommaso Boggio) (Pavia:Mattei & C., 1913)
- Il Problema dei Tre Corpi da Newton ai Nostri Giorni (Milano, Ulrico Hoepli, 1919)
- Relatività (Messina, G. Principato, 1921)
