= Quartic function =

Polynomial function of degree 4

Graph of a polynomial of degree 4, with 3 critical points and four real roots (crossings of the x axis) (and thus no complex roots). If one or the other of the local minima were above the x axis, or if the local maximum were below it, or if there were no local maximum and one minimum below the x axis, there would only be two real roots (and two complex roots). If all three local extrema were above the x axis, or if there were no local maximum and one minimum above the x axis, there would be no real root (and four complex roots). The same reasoning applies in reverse to polynomial with a negative quartic coefficient.

In algebra, a quartic function is a function of the form

$$f(x)=ax^4+bx^3+cx^2+dx+e,$$

where a is nonzero, which is defined by a polynomial of degree four, called a quartic polynomial.

A quartic equation, or equation of the fourth degree, is an equation that equates a quartic polynomial to zero, of the form

$$ax^4+bx^3+cx^2+dx+e=0 ,$$

where a ≠ 0. The derivative of a quartic function is a cubic function.

Sometimes the term biquadratic is used instead of quartic, but, usually, biquadratic function refers to a quadratic function of a square (or, equivalently, to the function defined by a quartic polynomial without terms of odd degree), having the form

$$f(x)=ax^4+cx^2+e.$$

Since a quartic function is defined by a polynomial of even degree, it has the same infinite limit when the argument goes to positive or negative infinity. If a is positive, then the function increases to positive infinity at both ends; and thus the function has a global minimum. Likewise, if a is negative, it decreases to negative infinity and has a global maximum. In both cases it may or may not have another local maximum and another local minimum.

The degree four (quartic case) is the highest degree such that every polynomial equation can be solved by radicals, according to the Abel–Ruffini theorem.

== History ==
Lodovico Ferrari is credited with the discovery of the solution to the quartic in 1540, but since this solution, like all algebraic solutions of the quartic, requires the solution of a cubic to be found, it could not be published immediately. The solution of the quartic was published together with that of the cubic by Ferrari's mentor Gerolamo Cardano in the book Ars Magna.

The proof that four is the highest degree of a general polynomial for which such solutions can be found was first given in the Abel–Ruffini theorem in 1824, proving that all attempts at solving the higher order polynomials would be futile. The notes left by Évariste Galois prior to dying in a duel in 1832 later led to an elegant complete theory of the roots of polynomials, of which this theorem was one result.

== Applications ==
Each coordinate of the intersection points of two conic sections is a solution of a quartic equation. The same is true for the intersection of a line and a torus. It follows that quartic equations often arise in computational geometry and all related fields such as computer graphics, computer-aided design, computer-aided manufacturing and optics. Here are examples of other geometric problems whose solution involves solving a quartic equation.

In computer-aided manufacturing, the torus is a shape that is commonly associated with the endmill cutter. To calculate its location relative to a triangulated surface, the position of a horizontal torus on the z-axis must be found where it is tangent to a fixed line, and this requires the solution of a general quartic equation to be calculated.

A quartic equation arises also in the process of solving the crossed ladders problem, in which the lengths of two crossed ladders, each based against one wall and leaning against another, are given along with the height at which they cross, and the distance between the walls is to be found.

In optics, Alhazen's problem is "Given a light source and a spherical mirror, find the point on the mirror where the light will be reflected to the eye of an observer." This leads to a quartic equation.

Finding the distance of closest approach of two ellipses involves solving a quartic equation.

The eigenvalues of a 4×4 matrix are the roots of a quartic polynomial which is the characteristic polynomial of the matrix.

The characteristic equation of a fourth-order linear difference equation or differential equation is a quartic equation. An example arises in the Timoshenko-Rayleigh theory of beam bending.

Intersections between spheres, cylinders, or other quadrics can be found using quartic equations.

== Inflection points and golden ratio ==
Letting F and G be the distinct inflection points of the graph of a quartic function, and letting H be the intersection of the inflection secant line FG and the quartic, nearer to G than to F, then G divides FH into the golden section:

$$\frac{FG}{GH}=\frac{1+\sqrt{5}}{2}= \varphi \; (\text{the golden ratio}).$$

Moreover, the area of the region between the secant line and the quartic below the secant line equals the area of the region between the secant line and the quartic above the secant line. One of those regions is disjointed into sub-regions of equal area.

== Solution ==
=== Nature of the roots ===
Given the general quartic equation

$$ax^4 + bx^3 + cx^2 + dx + e = 0$$

with real coefficients and a ≠ 0 the nature of its roots is mainly determined by the sign of its discriminant

$$\begin{align}
\Delta = {} &256 a^3 e^3 - 192 a^2 b d e^2 - 128 a^2 c^2 e^2 + 144 a^2 c d^2 e - 27 a^2 d^4 \\
&+ 144 a b^2 c e^2 - 6 a b^2 d^2 e - 80 a b c^2 d e + 18 a b c d^3 + 16 a c^4 e \\
&- 4 a c^3 d^2 - 27 b^4 e^2 + 18 b^3 c d e - 4 b^3 d^3 - 4 b^2 c^3 e + b^2 c^2 d^2
\end{align}$$

This may be refined by considering the signs of four other polynomials:

$$P = 8ac - 3b^2$$

such that P/8a^{2} is the second degree coefficient of the associated depressed quartic (see below);

$$R= b^3+8da^2-4abc,$$

such that R/8a^{3} is the first degree coefficient of the associated depressed quartic;

$$\Delta_0 = c^2 - 3bd + 12ae,$$

which is 0 if the quartic has a triple root; and

$$D = 64 a^3 e - 16 a^2 c^2 + 16 a b^2 c - 16 a^2 bd - 3 b^4$$

which is 0 if the quartic has two double roots.

The possible cases for the nature of the roots are as follows:

- If ∆ < 0 then the equation has two distinct real roots and two complex conjugate non-real roots.
- If ∆ > 0 then either the equation's four roots are all real or none is.
  - If P < 0 and D < 0 then all four roots are real and distinct.
  - If P > 0 or D > 0 then there are two pairs of non-real complex conjugate roots.
- If ∆ = 0 then (and only then) the polynomial has a multiple root. Here are the different cases that can occur:
  - If P < 0 and D < 0 and ∆_{0} ≠ 0, there are a real double root and two real simple roots.
  - If D > 0 or (P > 0 and (D ≠ 0 or R ≠ 0)), there are a real double root and two complex conjugate roots.
  - If ∆_{0} = 0 and D ≠ 0, there are a triple root and a simple root, all real.
  - If D = 0, then:
    - If P < 0, there are two real double roots.
    - If P > 0 and R = 0, there are two complex conjugate double roots.
    - If ∆_{0} = 0, all four roots are equal to −b/4a

There are some cases that do not seem to be covered, but in fact they cannot occur. For example, ∆_{0} > 0, P = 0 and D ≤ 0 is not a possible case. In fact, if ∆_{0} > 0 and P = 0 then D > 0, since $16 a^2\Delta_0 = 3D + P^2;$ so this combination is not possible.

=== General formula for roots ===
Solution of $x^4+ax^3+bx^2+cx+d=0$ written out in full. This formula is too unwieldy for general use; hence other methods, or simpler formulas for special cases, are generally used.

The four roots x_{1}, x_{2}, x_{3}, and x_{4} for the general quartic equation

$$ax^4+bx^3+cx^2+dx+e=0 \,$$

with a ≠ 0 are given in the following formula, which is deduced from the one in the section on Ferrari's method by back changing the variables (see § Converting to a depressed quartic) and using the formulas for the quadratic and cubic equations.

$$\begin{align}
x_{1,2}\ &= -\frac{b}{4a} - S \pm \frac12\sqrt{-4S^2 - 2p + \frac{q}{S}}\\
x_{3,4}\ &= -\frac{b}{4a} + S \pm \frac12\sqrt{-4S^2 - 2p - \frac{q}{S}}
\end{align}$$

where p and q are the coefficients of the second and of the first degree respectively in the associated depressed quartic

$$\begin{align}
p &= \frac{8ac-3b^2}{8a^2}\\
q &= \frac{b^3 - 4abc + 8a^2d}{8a^3}
\end{align}$$

and where

$$\begin{align}
S &= \frac{1}{2}\sqrt{-\frac23\ p+\frac{1}{3a}\left(Q + \frac{\Delta_0}{Q}\right)}\\
Q &= \sqrt[3]{\frac{\Delta_1 + \sqrt{\Delta_1^2 - 4\Delta_0^3}}{2}}
\end{align}$$

(if S = 0 or Q = 0, see § Special cases of the formula, below)

with

$$\begin{align}
\Delta_0 &= c^2 - 3bd + 12ae\\
\Delta_1 &= 2c^3 - 9bcd + 27b^2 e + 27ad^2 - 72ace
\end{align}$$

and

$\Delta_1^2-4\Delta_0^3 = - 27 \Delta\ ,$ where $\Delta$ is the aforementioned discriminant. For the cube root expression for Q, any of the three cube roots in the complex plane can be used, although if one of them is real that is the natural and simplest one to choose. The mathematical expressions of these last four terms are very similar to those of their cubic counterparts.

==== Special cases of the formula ====
- If $\Delta > 0,$ the value of $Q$ is a non-real complex number. In this case, either all roots are non-real or they are all real. In the latter case, the value of $S$ is also real, despite being expressed in terms of $Q;$ this is casus irreducibilis of the cubic function extended to the present context of the quartic. One may prefer to express it in a purely real way, by using trigonometric functions, as follows:

$$S = \frac{1}{2} \sqrt{-\frac23\ p+\frac{2}{3a}\sqrt{\Delta_0}\cos\frac{\varphi}{3}}$$

where

$$\varphi = \arccos\left(\frac{\Delta_1}{2\sqrt{\Delta_0^3}}\right).$$

- If $\Delta \neq 0$ and $\Delta_0 = 0,$ the sign of $\sqrt{\Delta_1^2 - 4 \Delta_0^3}=\sqrt{\Delta_1^2}$ has to be chosen to have $Q \neq 0,$ that is one should define $\sqrt{\Delta_1^2}$ as $\Delta_1,$ maintaining the sign of $\Delta_1.$
- If $S = 0,$ then one must change the choice of the cube root in $Q$ in order to have $S \neq 0.$ This is always possible except if the quartic may be factored into $\left(x+\tfrac{b}{4a}\right)^4.$ The result is then correct, but misleading because it hides the fact that no cube root is needed in this case. In fact this case may occur only if the numerator of $q$ is zero, in which case the associated depressed quartic is biquadratic; it may thus be solved by the method described below.
- If $\Delta = 0$ and $\Delta_0 = 0,$ and thus also $\Delta_1 = 0,$ at least three roots are equal to each other, and the roots are rational functions of the coefficients. The triple root $x_0$ is a common root of the quartic and its second derivative $2(6ax^2+3bx+c);$ it is thus also the unique root of the remainder of the Euclidean division of the quartic by its second derivative, which is a linear polynomial. The simple root $x_1$ can be deduced from $x_1+3x_0=-b/a.$
- If $\Delta=0$ and $\Delta_0 \neq 0,$ the above expression for the roots is correct but misleading, hiding the fact that the polynomial is reducible and no cube root is needed to represent the roots.

=== Simpler cases ===
==== Reducible quartics ====
Consider the general quartic

$$Q(x) = a_4x^4+a_3x^3+a_2x^2+a_1x+a_0.$$

It is reducible if Q(x) = R(x)×S(x), where R(x) and S(x) are non-constant polynomials with rational coefficients (or more generally with coefficients in the same field as the coefficients of Q(x)). Such a factorization will take one of two forms:

$$Q(x) = (x-x_1)(b_3x^3+b_2x^2+b_1x+b_0)$$

or

$$Q(x) = (c_2x^2+c_1x+c_0)(d_2x^2+d_1x+d_0).$$

In either case, the roots of Q(x) are the roots of the factors, which may be computed using the formulas for the roots of a quadratic function or cubic function.

Detecting the existence of such factorizations can be done using the resolvent cubic of Q(x). It turns out that:

- if we are working over R (that is, if coefficients are restricted to be real numbers) (or, more generally, over some real closed field) then there is always such a factorization;
- if we are working over Q (that is, if coefficients are restricted to be rational numbers) then there is an algorithm to determine whether or not Q(x) is reducible and, if it is, how to express it as a product of polynomials of smaller degree.

In fact, several methods of solving quartic equations (Ferrari's method, Descartes' method, and, to a lesser extent, Euler's method) are based upon finding such factorizations.

==== Biquadratic equation ====
If a_{3} = a_{1} = 0 then the function

$$Q(x) = a_4x^4+a_2x^2+a_0$$

is called a biquadratic function; equating it to zero defines a biquadratic equation, which is easy to solve as follows

Let the auxiliary variable z = x^{2}. Then Q(x) becomes a quadratic q in z: q(z) = a_{4}z^{2} + a_{2}z + a_{0}. Let z_{+} and z_{−} be the roots of q(z). Then the roots of the quartic Q(x) are

$$\begin{align}
x_1&=+\sqrt{z_+},
\\
x_2&=-\sqrt{z_+},
\\
x_3&=+\sqrt{z_-},
\\
x_4&=-\sqrt{z_-}.
\end{align}$$

==== Quasi-palindromic equation ====
The polynomial

$$P(x)=a_0x^4+a_1x^3+a_2x^2+a_1 m x+a_0 m^2$$

is almost palindromic, as P(mx) = x^{4}/m^{2}P(m/x) (it is palindromic if m = 1). The change of variables z = x + m/x in P(x)/x^{2} = 0 produces the quadratic equation a_{0}z^{2} + a_{1}z + a_{2} − 2ma_{0} = 0. Since x^{2} − xz + m = 0, the quartic equation P(x) = 0 may be solved by applying the quadratic formula twice.

=== Solution methods ===
==== Converting to a depressed quartic ====
For solving purposes, it is generally better to convert the quartic into a depressed quartic by the following simple change of variable. All formulas are simpler and some methods work only in this case. The roots of the original quartic are easily recovered from that of the depressed quartic by the reverse change of variable.

Let

$$a_4 x^4 + a_3 x^3 + a_2 x^2 + a_1 x + a_0 = 0$$

be the general quartic equation we want to solve.

Dividing by a_{4}, provides the equivalent equation x^{4} + bx^{3} + cx^{2} + dx + e = 0, with b = a_{3}/a_{4}, c = a_{2}/a_{4}, d = a_{1}/a_{4}, and e = a_{0}/a_{4}. Substituting y − b/4 for x gives, after regrouping the terms, the equation y^{4} + py^{2} + qy + r = 0, where

$$\begin{align}
p&=\frac{8c-3b^2}{8} =\frac{8a_2a_4-3{a_3}^2}{8{a_4}^2}\\
q&=\frac{b^3-4bc+8d}{8} =\frac{{a_3}^3-4a_2a_3a_4+8a_1{a_4}^2}{8{a_4}^3}\\
r&=\frac{-3b^4+256e-64bd+16b^2c}{256}=\frac{-3{a_3}^4+256a_0{a_4}^3-64a_1a_3{a_4}^2+16a_2{a_3}^2a_4}{256{a_4}^4}.
\end{align}$$

If y_{0} is a root of this depressed quartic, then y_{0} − b/4 (that is y_{0} − a_{3}/4a_{4}) is a root of the original quartic and every root of the original quartic can be obtained by this process.

==== Ferrari's solution ====
As explained in the preceding section, we may start with the depressed quartic equation

$$y^4 + p y^2 + q y + r = 0.$$

This depressed quartic can be solved by means of a method discovered by Lodovico Ferrari. The depressed equation may be rewritten (this is easily verified by expanding the square and regrouping all terms in the left-hand side) as

$$\left(y^2 + \frac p2\right)^2 = -q y - r + \frac{p^2}4.$$

Then, we introduce a variable m into the factor on the left-hand side by adding 2y^{2}m + pm + m^{2} to both sides. After regrouping the coefficients of the power of y on the right-hand side, this gives the equation

$\left(y^2 + \frac p2 + m\right)^2 = 2 m y^2 - q y + m^2 + m p + \frac{p^2}4 - r,$	1

which is equivalent to the original equation, whichever value is given to m.

As the value of m may be arbitrarily chosen, we will choose it in order to complete the square on the right-hand side. This implies that the discriminant in y of this quadratic equation is zero, that is m is a root of the equation

$$(-q)^2 - 4 (2m)\left(m^2 + p m + \frac{p^2}4 - r\right) = 0,\,$$

which may be rewritten as

$8m^3+ 8pm^2 + (2p^2 -8r)m- q^2 =0.$	1a

This is the resolvent cubic of the quartic equation. The value of m may thus be obtained from Cardano's formula. When m is a root of this equation, the right-hand side of equation (1) is the square

$$\left(\sqrt{2m}y-\frac q{2\sqrt{2m}}\right)^2.$$

However, this induces a division by zero if m = 0. This implies q = 0, and thus that the depressed equation is bi-quadratic, and may be solved by an easier method (see above). This was not a problem at the time of Ferrari, when one solved only explicitly given equations with numeric coefficients. For a general formula that is always true, one thus needs to choose a root of the cubic equation such that m ≠ 0. This is always possible except for the depressed equation y^{4} = 0.

Now, if m is a root of the cubic equation such that m ≠ 0, equation (1) becomes

$$\left(y^2 + \frac p2 + m\right)^2 = \left(y\sqrt{2 m}-\frac{q}{2\sqrt{2 m}}\right)^2.$$

This equation is of the form M^{2} = N^{2}, which can be rearranged as M^{2} − N^{2} = 0 or (M + N)(M − N) = 0. Therefore, equation (1) may be rewritten as

$$\left(y^2 + \frac p2 + m + \sqrt{2 m}y-\frac q{2\sqrt{2 m}}\right) \left(y^2 + \frac p2 + m - \sqrt{2 m}y+\frac q{2\sqrt{2 m}}\right)=0.$$

This equation is easily solved by applying to each factor the quadratic formula. Solving them we may write the four roots as

$$y={\pm_1\sqrt{2 m} \pm_2 \sqrt{-\left(2p + 2m \pm_1 {\sqrt 2q \over \sqrt{m}} \right)} \over 2},$$

where ±_{1} and ±_{2} denote either + or −. As the two occurrences of ±_{1} must denote the same sign, this leaves four possibilities, one for each root.

Therefore, the solutions of the original quartic equation are

$$x=-{a_3 \over 4a_4} + {\pm_1\sqrt{2 m} \pm_2 \sqrt{-\left(2p + 2m \pm_1 {\sqrt2q \over \sqrt{m}} \right)} \over 2}.$$

A comparison with the general formula above shows that √2m = 2S.

==== Descartes' solution ====
Descartes introduced in 1637 the method of finding the roots of a quartic polynomial by factoring it into two quadratic ones. Let

$$\begin{align}
x^4 + bx^3 + cx^2 + dx + e & = (x^2 + sx + t)(x^2 + ux + v) \\
& = x^4 + (s + u)x^3 + (t + v + su)x^2 + (sv + tu)x + tv
\end{align}$$

By equating coefficients, this results in the following system of equations:

$$\left\{\begin{array}{l}
b = s + u \\
c = t + v + su \\
d = sv + tu \\
e = tv
\end{array}\right.$$

This can be simplified by starting again with the depressed quartic y^{4} + py^{2} + qy + r, which can be obtained by substituting y − b/4 for x. Since the coefficient of y^{3} is 0, we get s = −u, and:

$$\left\{\begin{array}{l}
p + u^2 = t + v \\
q = u (t - v) \\
r = tv
\end{array}\right.$$

One can now eliminate both t and v by doing the following:

$$\begin{align}
u^2(p + u^2)^2 - q^2 & = u^2(t + v)^2 - u^2(t - v)^2 \\
& = u^2 [(t + v + (t - v))(t + v - (t - v))]\\
& = u^2(2t)(2v) \\
& = 4u^2tv \\
& = 4u^2r
\end{align}$$

If we set U = u^{2}, then solving this equation becomes finding the roots of the resolvent cubic

$U^3 + 2pU^2 + (p^2-4r)U - q^2,$	2

which is done elsewhere. This resolvent cubic is equivalent to the resolvent cubic given above (equation (1a)), as can be seen by substituting U = 2m.

If u is a square root of a non-zero root of this resolvent (such a non-zero root exists except for the quartic x^{4}, which is trivially factored),

$$\left\{\begin{array}{l}
s = -u \\
2t = p + u^2 + q/u \\
2v = p + u^2 - q/u
\end{array}\right.$$

The symmetries in this solution are as follows. There are three roots of the cubic, corresponding to the three ways that a quartic can be factored into two quadratics, and choosing positive or negative values of u for the square root of U merely exchanges the two quadratics with one another.

The above solution shows that a quartic polynomial with rational coefficients and a zero coefficient on the cubic term is factorable into quadratics with rational coefficients if and only if either the resolvent cubic (2) has a non-zero root which is the square of a rational, or p^{2} − 4r is the square of rational and q = 0; this can readily be checked using the rational root test.

==== Euler's solution ====
A variant of the previous method is due to Euler. Unlike the previous methods, both of which use some root of the resolvent cubic, Euler's method uses all of them. Consider a depressed quartic x^{4} + px^{2} + qx + r. Observe that, if

- x^{4} + px^{2} + qx + r = (x^{2} + sx + t)(x^{2} − sx + v),
- r_{1} and r_{2} are the roots of x^{2} + sx + t,
- r_{3} and r_{4} are the roots of x^{2} − sx + v,

then

- the roots of x^{4} + px^{2} + qx + r are r_{1}, r_{2}, r_{3}, and r_{4},
- r_{1} + r_{2} = −s,
- r_{3} + r_{4} = s.

Therefore, (r_{1} + r_{2})(r_{3} + r_{4}) = −s^{2}. In other words, −(r_{1} + r_{2})(r_{3} + r_{4}) is one of the roots of the resolvent cubic (2) and this suggests that the roots of that cubic are equal to −(r_{1} + r_{2})(r_{3} + r_{4}), −(r_{1} + r_{3})(r_{2} + r_{4}), and −(r_{1} + r_{4})(r_{2} + r_{3}). This is indeed true and it follows from Vieta's formulas. It also follows from Vieta's formulas, together with the fact that we are working with a depressed quartic, that r_{1} + r_{2} + r_{3} + r_{4} = 0. (Of course, this also follows from the fact that r_{1} + r_{2} + r_{3} + r_{4} = −s + s.) Therefore, if α, β, and γ are the roots of the resolvent cubic, then the numbers r_{1}, r_{2}, r_{3}, and r_{4} are such that

$$\left\{\begin{array}{l}r_1+r_2+r_3+r_4=0\\(r_1+r_2)(r_3+r_4)=-\alpha\\(r_1+r_3)(r_2+r_4)=-\beta\\(r_1+r_4)(r_2+r_3)=-\gamma\text{.}\end{array}\right.$$

It is a consequence of the first two equations that r_{1} + r_{2} is a square root of α and that r_{3} + r_{4} is the other square root of α. For the same reason,

- r_{1} + r_{3} is a square root of β,
- r_{2} + r_{4} is the other square root of β,
- r_{1} + r_{4} is a square root of γ,
- r_{2} + r_{3} is the other square root of γ.

Therefore, the numbers r_{1}, r_{2}, r_{3}, and r_{4} are such that

$$\left\{\begin{array}{l}r_1+r_2+r_3+r_4=0\\r_1+r_2=\sqrt{\alpha}\\r_1+r_3=\sqrt{\beta}\\r_1+r_4=\sqrt{\gamma}\text{;}\end{array}\right.$$

the sign of the square roots will be dealt with below. The only solution of this system is:

$$\left\{\begin{array}{l}r_1=\frac{\sqrt{\alpha}+\sqrt{\beta}+\sqrt{\gamma}}2\\[2mm]r_2=\frac{\sqrt{\alpha}-\sqrt{\beta}-\sqrt{\gamma}}2\\[2mm]r_3=\frac{-\sqrt{\alpha}+\sqrt{\beta}-\sqrt{\gamma}}2\\[2mm]r_4=\frac{-\sqrt{\alpha}-\sqrt{\beta}+\sqrt{\gamma}}2\text{.}\end{array}\right.$$

Since, in general, there are two choices for each square root, it might look as if this provides 8 (= 2^{3}) choices for the set {r_{1}, r_{2}, r_{3}, r_{4}}, but, in fact, it provides no more than 2 such choices, because the consequence of replacing one of the square roots by the symmetric one is that the set {r_{1}, r_{2}, r_{3}, r_{4}} becomes the set {−r_{1}, −r_{2}, −r_{3}, −r_{4}}.

In order to determine the right sign of the square roots, one simply chooses some square root for each of the numbers α, β, and γ and uses them to compute the numbers r_{1}, r_{2}, r_{3}, and r_{4} from the previous equalities. Then, one computes the number √α√β√γ. Since α, β, and γ are the roots of (2), it is a consequence of Vieta's formulas that their product is equal to q^{2} and therefore that √α√β√γ = ±q. But a straightforward computation shows that

√α√β√γ = r_{1}r_{2}r_{3} + r_{1}r_{2}r_{4} + r_{1}r_{3}r_{4} + r_{2}r_{3}r_{4}.

If this number is −q, then the choice of the square roots was a good one (again, by Vieta's formulas); otherwise, the roots of the polynomial will be −r_{1}, −r_{2}, −r_{3}, and −r_{4}, which are the numbers obtained if one of the square roots is replaced by the symmetric one (or, what amounts to the same thing, if each of the three square roots is replaced by the symmetric one).

This argument suggests another way of choosing the square roots:

- pick any square root √α of α and any square root √β of β;
- define √γ as $-\frac q{\sqrt{\alpha}\sqrt{\beta}}$.

Of course, this will make no sense if α or β is equal to 0, but 0 is a root of (2) only when q = 0, that is, only when we are dealing with a biquadratic equation, in which case there is a much simpler approach.

==== Solving by Lagrange resolvent ====
The symmetric group S_{4} on four elements has the Klein four-group as a normal subgroup. This suggests using a resolvent cubic whose roots may be variously described as a discrete Fourier transform or a Hadamard matrix transform of the roots; see Lagrange resolvents for the general method. Denote by x_{i}, for i from 0 to 3, the four roots of x^{4} + bx^{3} + cx^{2} + dx + e. If we set

$$\begin{align}
s_0 &= \tfrac12(x_0 + x_1 + x_2 + x_3), \\[4pt]
s_1 &= \tfrac12(x_0 - x_1 + x_2 - x_3), \\[4pt]
s_2 &= \tfrac12(x_0 + x_1 - x_2 - x_3), \\[4pt]
s_3 &= \tfrac12(x_0 - x_1 - x_2 + x_3),
\end{align}$$

then since the transformation is an involution we may express the roots in terms of the four s_{i} in exactly the same way. Since we know the value s_{0} = −b/2, we only need the values for s_{1}, s_{2} and s_{3}. These are the roots of the polynomial

$$(s^2 - {s_1}^2)(s^2-{s_2}^2)(s^2-{s_3}^2).$$

Substituting the s_{i} by their values in term of the x_{i}, this polynomial may be expanded in a polynomial in s whose coefficients are symmetric polynomials in the x_{i}. By the fundamental theorem of symmetric polynomials, these coefficients may be expressed as polynomials in the coefficients of the monic quartic. If, for simplification, we suppose that the quartic is depressed, that is b = 0, this results in the polynomial

$s^6+2cs^4+(c^2-4e)s^2-d^2$	3

This polynomial is of degree six, but only of degree three in s^{2}, and so the corresponding equation is solvable by the method described in the article about cubic function. By substituting the roots in the expression of the x_{i} in terms of the s_{i}, we obtain expression for the roots. In fact we obtain, apparently, several expressions, depending on the numbering of the roots of the cubic polynomial and of the signs given to their square roots. All these different expressions may be deduced from one of them by simply changing the numbering of the x_{i}.

These expressions are unnecessarily complicated, involving the cubic roots of unity, which can be avoided as follows. If s is any non-zero root of (3), and if we set

$$\begin{align}
F_1(x) & = x^2 + sx + \frac{c}{2} + \frac{s^2}{2} - \frac{d}{2s} \\
F_2(x) & = x^2 - sx + \frac{c}{2} + \frac{s^2}{2} + \frac{d}{2s}
\end{align}$$

then

$$F_1(x)\times F_2(x) = x^4 + cx^2 + dx + e.$$

We therefore can solve the quartic by solving for s and then solving for the roots of the two factors using the quadratic formula.

This gives exactly the same formula for the roots as the one provided by Descartes' method.

==== Solving with algebraic geometry ====
There is an alternative solution using algebraic geometry In brief, one interprets the roots as the intersection of two quadratic curves, then finds the three reducible quadratic curves (pairs of lines) that pass through these points (this corresponds to the resolvent cubic, the pairs of lines being the Lagrange resolvents), and then use these linear equations to solve the quadratic.

The four roots of the depressed quartic x^{4} + px^{2} + qx + r = 0 may also be expressed as the x coordinates of the intersections of the two quadratic equations y^{2} + py + qx + r = 0 and y − x^{2} = 0 i.e., using the substitution y = x^{2} that two quadratics intersect in four points is an instance of Bézout's theorem. Explicitly, the four points are P_{i} ≔ (x_{i}, x_{i}^{2}) for the four roots x_{i} of the quartic.

These four points are not collinear because they lie on the irreducible quadratic y = x^{2} and thus there is a 1-parameter family of quadratics (a pencil of curves) passing through these points. Writing the projectivization of the two quadratics as quadratic forms in three variables:

$$\begin{align}
F_1(X,Y,Z) &:= Y^2 + pYZ + qXZ + rZ^2,\\
F_2(X,Y,Z) &:= YZ - X^2
\end{align}$$

the pencil is given by the forms λF_{1} + μF_{2} for any point [λ, μ] in the projective line — in other words, where λ and μ are not both zero, and multiplying a quadratic form by a constant does not change its quadratic curve of zeros.

This pencil contains three reducible quadratics, each corresponding to a pair of lines, each passing through two of the four points, which can be done $\textstyle{\binom{4}{2}}$ = 6 different ways. Denote these Q_{1} = L_{12} + L_{34}, Q_{2} = L_{13} + L_{24}, and Q_{3} = L_{14} + L_{23}. Given any two of these, their intersection has exactly the four points.

The reducible quadratics, in turn, may be determined by expressing the quadratic form λF_{1} + μF_{2} as a 3×3 matrix: reducible quadratics correspond to this matrix being singular, which is equivalent to its determinant being zero, and the determinant is a homogeneous degree three polynomial in λ and μ and corresponds to the resolvent cubic.

== See also ==
- Linear function – Linear map or polynomial function of degree one
- Quadratic function – Polynomial function of degree two
- Cubic function – Polynomial function of degree 3
- Quintic function – Polynomial function of degree 5
