= Cesare Burali-Forti =

Italian mathematician (1861–1931)

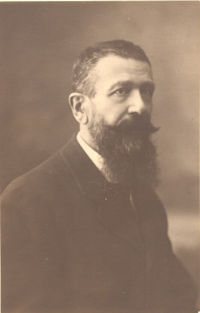
- Born: 13 August 1861; Arezzo, Kingdom of Italy
- Died: 21 January 1931 (aged 69); Turin, Kingdom of Italy
- Education: University of Pisa
- Known for: Burali-Forti paradox
- Spouse: Gemma Viviani (m. 1887)
- Children: 1
- Scientific career
- Fields: Mathematics
- Workplaces: Accademia Reale di Torino

Cesare Burali-Forti (13 August 1861 – 21 January 1931) was an Italian mathematician, after whom the Burali-Forti paradox is named. He was a prolific writer, with 200 publications.

== Early life ==
Burali-Forti was born in Arezzo, and he obtained his degree from the University of Pisa in 1884.

== Career ==
In 1886, after two years of middle-school service in Sicily, Burali-Forti won a competition to become professor of analytic and projective geometry at the military academy in Turin. He was an assistant of Giuseppe Peano in Turin from 1894 to 1896, during which time he discovered a theorem which Bertrand Russell later realised contradicted a previously proved result by Georg Cantor. The contradiction came to be known as the Burali-Forti paradox of Cantorian set theory.

== Personal life and death ==
He married Gemma Viviani on 29 October 1887 and they had a son named Umberto.

He died in Turin on 21 January 1931.

== Works ==
- Analyse vectorielle générale: Applications à la mécanique et à la physique. with Roberto Marcolongo (Mattéi & co., Pavia, 1913).
- Applications à la mécanique et à la physique. With Tommasio Boggio and Roberto Marcolongo (Mattei & co., 1913)
- Corso di geometria analitico-proiettiva per gli allievi della R. Accademia Militare (G. B. Petrini di G. Gallizio, Torino, 1912).
- Elementi di calcolo vettoriale con numerose applicazioni alla geometria, alla meccanica e alla fisica-matematica. With Roberto Marcolongo (N. Zanichelli, 1920)
- Geometria descrittiva (S. Lattes & c., Torino, 1921).
- Introduction à la géométrie différentielle, suivant la méthode de H. Grassmann (Gauthier-Villars, 1897).
- Lezioni Di Geometria Metrico-Proiettiva (Fratelli Bocca, Torino, 1904).
- Meccanica razionale with Tommaso Boggio (S. Lattes & c., Torino, 1921).
- Logica Matematica (Hoepli, Milano, 1894).
- Complete listing of publications and bibliography, 8 pages.

English translations

- Jean van Heijenoort, 1967. A Source Book in Mathematical Logic, 1879-1931. Harvard Univ. Press.
  - 1897. "A question on transfinite numbers," 104-11.
  - 1897. "On well-ordered classes," 111-12.
