= Hsinchu Campaign =

- Part of the Japanese invasion of Taiwan (1895)
Date	11 June – 2 August 1895
Location	Hsinchu, Taiwan
Result	Japanese victory

Belligerents
Empire of Japan	Republic of Formosa

Commanders and leaders
Major-General Nobunari Yamane	Lin Chaodong

Strength
18,000 troops & 190 cavalrys	23,000 tribes & 210 horsemen

Casualties and losses
189 killed & 397 wounded	8,000 killed

The Hsinchu Campaign (11 June – 2 August 1895) was an important military campaign during the Japanese invasion of Taiwan (1895). The Japanese capture of Hsinchu on 22 June 1895 was succeeded by several weeks of intense guerrilla activity, and marked the emergence of a significant Formosan resistance movement to the Japanese invasion.

== Background ==
The Japanese had hoped that their occupation of Taipei on 8 June 1895 would end the fighting in Taiwan. It did not. The Republic of Formosa tottered on for another five months of existence, as its presidency was assumed by Liu Yung-fu on 26 June in Tainan. Liu's assumption of the presidency stiffened the will of ordinary Formosans to resist the invaders. The result was a perceptible growth in guerrilla activity against the Japanese, and as the month of June wore on it became clear that all the island's main towns would have to be occupied forcibly before opposition to the Japanese invasion collapsed. From now on, the capture of Tainan became a political as well as a strategic imperative for the Japanese. During the next four months the Japanese would direct their efforts towards occupying Tainan and snuffing out the nascent Formosan Republic.

== Capture of Hsinchu ==
On 11 June the Imperial Guards Division left Taipei and began to march south. Its immediate objectives were the towns of Tokoham (Daxi District) and Tek-cham (Hsinchu). The Japanese captured Hsinchu with little trouble on 22 June. The Chinese troops of the Hsinchu garrison removed their uniforms and handed over their weapons to the Japanese as soon as they entered the city.

== Tokoham area ==
One of the most successful insurgent attacks was made on 11 July on a party of 35 Japanese infantrymen who were conveying supplies by boat from Taipei to Tokoham. The Japanese were ambushed, and although they fought bravely, all but one of the party were either killed or so badly wounded that they committed suicide rather than fall alive into the hands of the enemy. One soldier, Private Tanaka, escaped to bring the news of this disaster to his comrades. The Japanese responded by sending a detachment of cavalry to scout Tokoham. En route to Tokoham the troopers were warmly welcomed by the villagers of Pankiu (Panchiao, 板橋), the home of the extremely wealthy Lin family, but as soon as they left the village they were ambushed. Some of the troopers were able to return to Pankiu and were given shelter by the Lin family servants. The Japanese now dispatched two strong columns to the area, and on 12 July fought a major action with the insurgents for possession of the village of Long-tampo.

Another serious attack was made on 12 July by a strong force of insurgents on a Japanese column under the command of Major Bojo, which was also marching towards Tokoham. Bojo's column included three infantry companies and a small force of combat engineers, and was surrounded and ambushed by the insurgents. The Japanese fought bravely, and the Formosans were unable to break their resistance. At the same time, Bojo's men were completely cut off from the Japanese main body. Finally, four Japanese soldiers volunteered to disguise themselves as Chinese and go for help. They reached Major-General Yamane's main body on 16 July. Relief was at once dispatched, but when rescued Bojo's column was on the verge of exhaustion, with hardly any food or ammunition left.

== Battle of Mount Chienbishan ==
While the Japanese were trying to clear their supply lines back to Taipei, Formosan militia units continued to demonstrate around Hsinchu. On 10 July the Japanese attacked the Hakka militias on the heights of Chienbishan (Traditional Chinese: 尖筆山) near Miaoli. The Formosans were entrenched, but had no modern artillery. The Japanese attacked from two sides and defeated them. Japanese casualties were only 11 killed or wounded, while the bodies of 200 dead Formosans were recovered from the battlefield. The Japanese also took 110 prisoners, one of whom was the guerrilla leader Chiang Shao-tsu. On 11 July Chiang committed suicide by taking opium. Wu Tang-hsing thereupon assumed command of the Hakka militias, and on 23 July led them back in retreat to Miaoli.

== Sankakeng operation ==
In the last week of July the Japanese conducted a major sweep of the districts between Taipei and Hsinchu, with the aim of clearing the insurgents away from their supply lines. Three columns were involved. The first and largest column, 2,000 men under the personal command of Major-General Yamane, was formed at Tokoham. The second and third columns, 1,000 men under the command of Colonel Naito and 600 men under the command of Colonel Matsubara, assembled at Haisoankau (Kaisanko) and Taipei respectively. All three columns were to converge on Sankakeng, where it was believed the insurgents were assembling a large force. Yamane's column set off from Tokoham on 22 July, engaged a force of around 500 insurgents five miles from Sankakeng, and drove them back. On 23 July, however, the column was counterattacked by the insurgents, who made good use of the ground. Although the Japanese defeated the counterattack, their casualties were 2 killed and 22 wounded. Chinese casualties were 40 killed and probably many more wounded. On the evening of 23 July Yamane was reinforced by the other two columns, and on 24 July, the insurgents having been dispersed, all three columns returned to their starting points.

== Capture of Sinpu ==
A second sweep was carried out a week later by the same three columns, to subdue some scattered bands of insurgents. Naito and Matsubara's columns set off from Haisoankan and Taipei on 29 July, while Yamane's column left Tokoham on 31 July. This time the objective was the large village of Sinpu (Sinpo). On 29 July Naito's column fought a fierce action against a force of 400 insurgents near Haisoankan. The insurgents were defeated and Naito's column continued its westward march, towards Tiongleck. Japanese losses were 5 killed and wounded, while 64 Chinese bodies were recovered from the battlefield. On the same day Yamane's column drove an insurgent force from a defensive position on a plateau between Si-si and Yang-mei-leck. Meanwhile, Matsubara's column advanced without meeting the insurgents, and on 30 July occupied Tiongleck.

On 1 August Naito's column replaced Matsubara's column at Tiongleck, while Matsubara's men advanced towards Sinpu. On the same day Yamane's column drove the insurgents from Niu-lan-wa and advanced to Sinpu. The Japanese scouted Sinpu and defeated a force of insurgents near the village's eastern gate. As the Japanese prepared to enter the village, the gate was closed against them and they were fired on when they attempted to scale the walls. It was clear that the invaders would have to fight a major action to capture Sinpu, and Yamane fell back and bivouacked at San-kap-tsui on the night of 1 August.

On 2 August the three Japanese columns combined, and bombarded and stormed Sinpu. The insurgents had barricaded themselves within the village's houses, but the Japanese were able to smash down the walls with their artillery. The Japanese fought their way through the village, capturing large numbers of insurgents. Some of the insurgents refused to surrender, and the Japanese were forced to take a number of barricaded houses by storm. Chinese casualties during this engagement were around 150 dead; Japanese casualties were only 7 men killed and wounded. The capture of Sinpu marked the end of the sweep, and the three Japanese columns again returned to their bases.
