= Boggio's formula =

In the mathematical field of potential theory, Boggio's formula is an explicit formula for the Green's function for the polyharmonic Dirichlet problem on the ball of radius 1. It was discovered by the Italian mathematician Tommaso Boggio.

The polyharmonic problem is to find a function u satisfying

$$(-\Delta)^m u(x) = f(x)$$

where m is a positive integer, and $(-\Delta)$ represents the Laplace operator. The Green's function is a function satisfying

$$(-\Delta)^m G(x,y) = \delta(x-y)$$

where $\delta$ represents the Dirac delta distribution, and in addition is equal to 0 up to order m-1 at the boundary.

Boggio found that the Green's function on the ball in n spatial dimensions is

$$G_{m,n} (x,y) = C_{m,n} |x-y|^{2m-n} \int_1^{\frac{\left||x|y - \frac{x}{|x|}\right|}{|x-y|}} (v^2-1)^{m-1} v^{1-n} dv$$

The constant $C_{m,n}$ is given by

$C_{m,n} =\frac{1}{n e_n 4^{m-1} ((m-1)!)^2},$ where $e_n = \frac{\pi^{\frac{n}{2}}}{\Gamma(1+\frac{n}{2})}$

== Sources ==
- Boggio, Tomas (1905), "Sulle funzioni di Green d'ordine m", Rendiconti del Circolo Matematico di Palermo, vol. 20, pp. 97–135, doi:10.1007/BF03014033, S2CID 123576345
- Gazzola, Filippo; Grunau, Hans-Christoph; Sweers, Guido (2010), Polyharmonic Boundary Value Problems (PDF), Lecture Notes in Mathematics, vol. 1991, Berlin: Springer, ISBN 978-3-642-12244-6
