= Resolvent (Galois theory) =

Invariant of polynomial roots

In Galois theory, a discipline within the field of abstract algebra, a resolvent for a permutation group G is a polynomial whose coefficients depend polynomially on the coefficients of a given polynomial p and has, roughly speaking, a rational root if and only if the Galois group of p is included in G. More exactly, if the Galois group is included in G, then the resolvent has a rational root, and the converse is true if the rational root is a simple root. Resolvents were introduced by Joseph Louis Lagrange and systematically used by Évariste Galois. Nowadays they are still a fundamental tool to compute Galois groups. The simplest examples of resolvents are

- $X^2-\Delta$ where $\Delta$ is the discriminant, which is a resolvent for the alternating group. In the case of a cubic equation, this resolvent is sometimes called the quadratic resolvent; its roots appear explicitly in the formulas for the roots of a cubic equation.
- The cubic resolvent of a quartic equation, which is a resolvent for the dihedral group of 8 elements.
- The Cayley resolvent is a resolvent for the maximal solvable Galois group in degree five. It is a polynomial of degree 6.

These three resolvents have the property of being always separable, which means that, if they have a multiple root, then the polynomial p is not irreducible. It is not known if there is an always separable resolvent for every group of permutations.

For every equation the roots may be expressed in terms of radicals and of a root of a resolvent for a solvable group, because the Galois group of the equation over the field generated by this root is solvable.

== Definition ==
Let n be a positive integer, which will be the degree of the equation that we will consider, and (X_{1}, ..., X_{n}) an ordered list of indeterminates. According to Vieta's formulas this defines the generic monic polynomial of degree n
$$F(X)=X^n+\sum_{i=1}^n (-1)^i E_i X^{n-i} = \prod_{i=1}^n (X-X_i),$$
where E_{i} is the i th elementary symmetric polynomial.

The symmetric group S_{n} acts on the X_{i} by permuting them, and this induces an action on the polynomials in the X_{i}. The stabilizer of a given polynomial under this action is generally trivial, but some polynomials have a bigger stabilizer. For example, the stabilizer of an elementary symmetric polynomial is the whole group S_{n}. If the stabilizer is non-trivial, the polynomial is fixed by some non-trivial subgroup G; it is said to be an invariant of G. Conversely, given a subgroup G of S_{n}, an invariant of G is a resolvent invariant for G if it is not an invariant of any bigger subgroup of S_{n}.

Finding invariants for a given subgroup G of S_{n} is relatively easy; one can sum the orbit of a monomial under the action of S_{n}. However, it may occur that the resulting polynomial is an invariant for a larger group. For example, consider the case of the subgroup G of S_{4} of order 4, consisting of (12)(34), (13)(24), (14)(23) and the identity (for the notation, see Permutation group). The monomial X_{1}X_{2} gives the invariant 2(X_{1}X_{2} + X_{3}X_{4}). It is not a resolvent invariant for G, because being invariant by (12), it is in fact a resolvent invariant for the larger dihedral subgroup D_{4}: ⟨(12), (1324)⟩, and is used to define the resolvent cubic of the quartic equation.

If P is a resolvent invariant for a group G of index m inside S_{n}, then its orbit under S_{n} has order m. Let P_{1}, ..., P_{m} be the elements of this orbit. Then the polynomial

$$R_G=\prod_{i=1}^m (Y-P_i)$$

is invariant under S_{n}. Thus, when expanded, its coefficients are polynomials in the X_{i} that are invariant under the action of the symmetry group and thus may be expressed as polynomials in the elementary symmetric polynomials. In other words, R_{G} is an irreducible polynomial in Y whose coefficients are polynomial in the coefficients of F. Having the resolvent invariant as a root, it is called a resolvent (sometimes resolvent equation).

Consider now an irreducible polynomial

$$f(X)=X^n+\sum_{i=1}^n a_i X^{n-i} = \prod_{i=1}^n (X-x_i),$$

with coefficients in a given field K (typically the field of rationals) and roots x_{i} in an algebraically closed field extension. Substituting the X_{i} by the x_{i} and the coefficients of F by those of f in the above, we get a polynomial $R_G^{(f)}(Y)$, also called resolvent or specialized resolvent in case of ambiguity). If the Galois group of f is contained in G, the specialization of the resolvent invariant is invariant by G and is thus a root of $R_G^{(f)}(Y)$ that belongs to K (is rational on K). Conversely, if $R_G^{(f)}(Y)$ has a rational root, which is not a multiple root, the Galois group of f is contained in G.

== Terminology ==
There are some variants in the terminology.

- Depending on the authors or on the context, resolvent may refer to resolvent invariant instead of to resolvent equation.
- A Galois resolvent is a resolvent such that the resolvent invariant is linear in the roots.
- The Lagrange resolvent may refer to the linear polynomial
  $$\sum_{i=0}^{n-1} X_i \omega^i$$
  where $\omega$ is a primitive nth root of unity. It is the resolvent invariant of a Galois resolvent for the identity group.
- A relative resolvent is defined similarly as a resolvent, but considering only the action of the elements of a given subgroup H of S_{n}, having the property that, if a relative resolvent for a subgroup G of H has a rational simple root and the Galois group of f is contained in H, then the Galois group of f is contained in G. In this context, a usual resolvent is called an absolute resolvent.

== Resolvent method ==
The Galois group of a polynomial of degree $n$ is $S_n$ or a proper subgroup of it. If a polynomial is separable and irreducible, then the corresponding Galois group is a transitive subgroup.

Transitive subgroups of $S_n$ form a directed graph: one group can be a subgroup of several groups. One resolvent can tell if the Galois group of a polynomial is a (not necessarily proper) subgroup of given group. The resolvent method is just a systematic way to check groups one by one until only one group is possible. This does not mean that every group must be checked: every resolvent can cancel out many possible groups. For example, for degree five polynomials there is never need for a resolvent of $D_5$: resolvents for $A_5$ and $M_{20}$ give desired information.

One way is to begin from maximal (transitive) subgroups until the right one is found and then continue with maximal subgroups of that.
