= Resolvent cubic =

Cubic polynomials defined from a monic polynomial of degree four

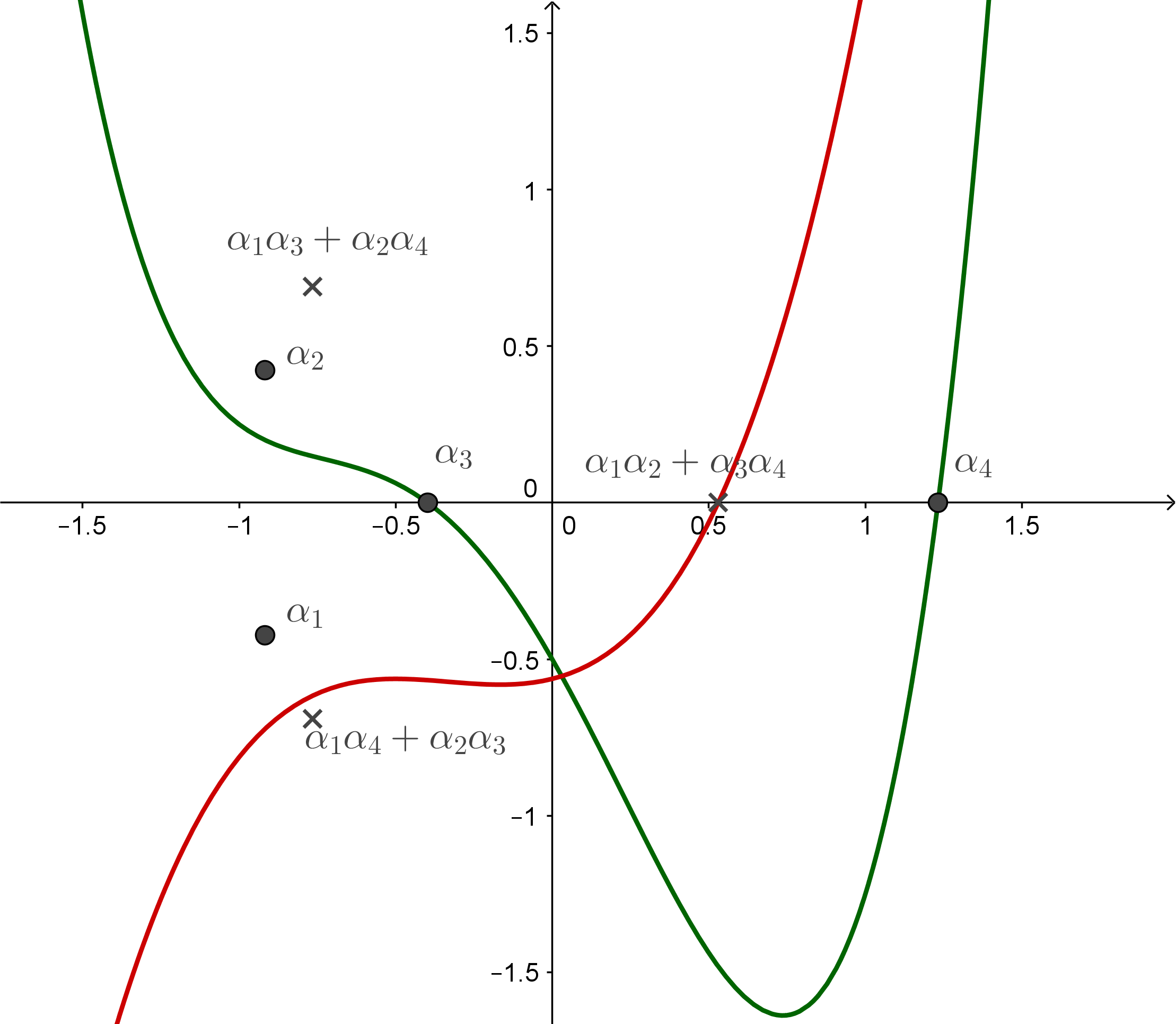
Graph of the polynomial function x^{4} + x^{3} – x^{2} – 7x/4 – 1/2 (in green) together with the graph of its resolvent cubic R_{4}(y) (in red). The roots of both polynomials are visible too.

In algebra, a resolvent cubic is one of several distinct, although related, cubic polynomials defined from a monic polynomial of degree four:

$$P(x)=x^4+a_3x^3+a_2x^2+a_1x+a_0.$$

In each case:

- The coefficients of the resolvent cubic can be obtained from the coefficients of P(x) using only sums, subtractions and multiplications.
- Knowing the roots of the resolvent cubic of P(x) is useful for finding the roots of P(x) itself. Hence the name “resolvent cubic”.
- The polynomial P(x) has a multiple root if and only if its resolvent cubic has a multiple root.

== Definitions ==
Suppose that the coefficients of P(x) belong to a field k whose characteristic is different from 2. Whenever roots of P(x) are mentioned, they belong to some extension K of k such that P(x) factors into linear factors in K[x]. If k is the field Q of rational numbers, then K can be the field C of complex numbers or the field Q̅ of algebraic numbers.

In some cases, the concept of resolvent cubic is defined only when P(x) is a quartic in depressed form—that is, when a_{3} = 0.

Note that the fourth and fifth definitions below also make sense and that the relationship between these resolvent cubics and P(x) are still valid if the characteristic of k is equal to 2.

=== First definition ===
Suppose that P(x) is a depressed quartic—that is, that a_{3} = 0. A possible definition of the resolvent cubic of P(x) is:

$$R_1(y)=8y^3+8a_2y^2+(2{a_2}^2-8a_0)y-{a_1}^2.$$

The origin of this definition lies in applying Ferrari's method to find the roots of P(x). To be more precise:

$$\begin{align}P(x)=0&\Longleftrightarrow x^4+a_2x^2=-a_1x-a_0\\ &\Longleftrightarrow
\left(x^2+\frac{a_2}2\right)^2=-a_1x-a_0+\frac{{a_2}^2}4.\end{align}$$

Add a new unknown, y, to x^{2} + a_{2}/2. Now you have:

$$\begin{align}\left(x^2+\frac{a_2}2+y\right)^2&=-a_1x-a_0+\frac{{a_2}^2}4+2x^2y+a_2y+y^2\\
&=2yx^2-a_1x-a_0+\frac{{a_2}^2}4+a_2y+y^2.\end{align}$$

If this expression is a square, it can only be the square of

$$\sqrt{2y}\,x-\frac{a_1}{2\sqrt{2y}}.$$

But the equality

$$\left(\sqrt{2y}\,x-\frac{a_1}{2\sqrt{2y}}\right)^2=2yx^2-a_1x-a_0+\frac{{a_2}^2}4+a_2y+y^2$$

is equivalent to

$$\frac{{a_1}^2}{8y}=-a_0+\frac{{a_2}^2}4+a_2y+y^2\text{,}$$

and this is the same thing as the assertion that R_{1}(y) = 0.

If y_{0} is a root of R_{1}(y), then it is a consequence of the computations made above that the roots of P(x) are the roots of the polynomial

$$x^2-\sqrt{2y_0}\,x+\frac{a_2}2+y_0+\frac{a_1}{2\sqrt{2y_0}}$$

together with the roots of the polynomial

$$x^2+\sqrt{2y_0}\,x+\frac{a_2}2+y_0-\frac{a_1}{2\sqrt{2y_0}}.$$

Of course, this makes no sense if y_{0} = 0, but since the constant term of R_{1}(y) is –a_{1}^{2}, 0 is a root of R_{1}(y) if and only if a_{1} = 0, and in this case the roots of P(x) can be found using the quadratic formula.

=== Second definition ===
Another possible definition (still supposing that P(x) is a depressed quartic) is

$$R_2(y)=8y^3-4a_2y^2-8a_0y+4a_2a_0-{a_1}^2$$

The origin of this definition is similar to the previous one. This time, we start by doing:

$$\begin{align}P(x)=0&\Longleftrightarrow x^4=-a_2x^2-a_1x-a_0\\ &\Longleftrightarrow(x^2+y)^2=-a_2x^2-a_1x-a_0+2yx^2+y^2\end{align}$$

and a computation similar to the previous one shows that this last expression is a square if and only if

$$8y^3-4a_2y^2-8a_0y+4a_2a_0-{a_1}^2=0\text{.}$$

A simple computation shows that

$$R_2\left(y+\frac{a_2}2\right)=R_1(y).$$

=== Third definition ===
Another possible definition (again, supposing that P(x) is a depressed quartic) is

$$R_3(y)=y^3+2a_2y^2+({a_2}^2-4a_0)y-{a_1}^2\text{.}$$

The origin of this definition lies in another method of solving quartic equations, namely Descartes' method. If you try to find the roots of P(x) by expressing it as a product of two monic quadratic polynomials x^{2} + αx + β and x^{2} – αx + γ, then

$$P(x)=(x^2+\alpha x+\beta)(x^2-\alpha x+\gamma)\Longleftrightarrow\left\{\begin{array}{l}\beta+\gamma-\alpha^2=a_2\\ \alpha(-\beta+\gamma)=a_1\\ \beta\gamma=a_0.\end{array}\right.$$

If there is a solution of this system with α ≠ 0 (note that if a_{1} ≠ 0, then this is automatically true for any solution), the previous system is equivalent to

$$\left\{\begin{array}{l}\beta+\gamma=a_2+\alpha^2\\-\beta+\gamma=\frac{a_1}{\alpha}\\ \beta\gamma=a_0.\end{array}\right.$$

It is a consequence of the first two equations that then

$$\beta=\frac12\left(a_2+\alpha^2-\frac{a_1}{\alpha}\right)$$

and

$$\gamma=\frac12\left(a_2+\alpha^2+\frac{a_1}{\alpha}\right).$$

After replacing, in the third equation, β and γ by these values one gets that

$$\left(a_2+\alpha^2\right)^2-\frac{{a_1}^2}{\alpha^2}=4a_0\text{,}$$

and this is equivalent to the assertion that α^{2} is a root of R_{3}(y). So, again, knowing the roots of R_{3}(y) helps to determine the roots of P(x).

Note that

$$R_3(y)=R_1\left(\frac y2\right)\text{.}$$

=== Fourth definition ===
Still another possible definition is

$$R_4(y)=y^3-a_2y^2+(a_1a_3-4a_0)y+4a_0a_2-{a_1}^2-a_0{a_3}^2.$$

In fact, if the roots of P(x) are α_{1}, α_{2}, α_{3}, and α_{4}, then

$$R_4(y)=\bigl(y-(\alpha_1\alpha_2+\alpha_3\alpha_4)\bigr)\bigl(y-(\alpha_1\alpha_3+\alpha_2\alpha_4)\bigr)\bigl(y-(\alpha_1\alpha_4+\alpha_2\alpha_3)\bigr)\text{,}$$

a fact the follows from Vieta's formulas. In other words, R_{4}(y) is the monic polynomial whose roots are α_{1}α_{2} + α_{3}α_{4}, α_{1}α_{3} + α_{2}α_{4}, and α_{1}α_{4} + α_{2}α_{3}.

It is easy to see that

$$\alpha_1\alpha_2+\alpha_3\alpha_4-(\alpha_1\alpha_3+\alpha_2\alpha_4)=(\alpha_1-\alpha_4)(\alpha_2-\alpha_3)\text{,}$$
$$\alpha_1\alpha_3+\alpha_2\alpha_4-(\alpha_1\alpha_4+\alpha_2\alpha_3)=(\alpha_1-\alpha_2)(\alpha_3-\alpha_4)\text{,}$$
$$\alpha_1\alpha_2+\alpha_3\alpha_4-(\alpha_1\alpha_4+\alpha_2\alpha_3)=(\alpha_1-\alpha_3)(\alpha_2-\alpha_4)\text{.}$$

Therefore, P(x) has a multiple root if and only if R_{4}(y) has a multiple root. More precisely, P(x) and R_{4}(y) have the same discriminant.

If P(x) is a depressed polynomial, then

$$\begin{align}R_4(y)&=y^3-a_2y^2-4a_0y+4a_0a_2-{a_1}^2\\ &=R_2\left(\frac y2\right)\text{.}\end{align}$$

=== Fifth definition ===
Yet another definition is

$$R_5(y)=y^3-2a_2y^2+({a_2}^2+a_3a_1-4a_0)y+{a_1}^2-a_3a_2a_1+{a_3}^2a_0\text{.}$$

If, as above, the roots of P(x) are α_{1}, α_{2}, α_{3}, and α_{4}, then

$$R_5(y)=\bigl(y-(\alpha_1+\alpha_2)(\alpha_3+\alpha_4)\bigr)\bigl(y-(\alpha_1+\alpha_3)(\alpha_2+\alpha_4)\bigr)\bigl(y-(\alpha_1+\alpha_4)(\alpha_2+\alpha_3)\bigr)\text{,}$$

again as a consequence of Vieta's formulas. In other words, R_{5}(y) is the monic polynomial whose roots are (α_{1} + α_{2})(α_{3} + α_{4}), (α_{1} + α_{3})(α_{2} + α_{4}), and (α_{1} + α_{4})(α_{2} + α_{3}).

It is easy to see that

$$(\alpha_1+\alpha_2)(\alpha_3+\alpha_4)-(\alpha_1+\alpha_3)(\alpha_2+\alpha_4)=-(\alpha_1-\alpha_4)(\alpha_2-\alpha_3)\text{,}$$
$$(\alpha_1+\alpha_2)(\alpha_3+\alpha_4)-(\alpha_1+\alpha_4)(\alpha_2+\alpha_3)=-(\alpha_1-\alpha_3)(\alpha_2-\alpha_4)\text{,}$$
$$(\alpha_1+\alpha_3)(\alpha_2+\alpha_4)-(\alpha_1+\alpha_4)(\alpha_2+\alpha_3)=-(\alpha_1-\alpha_2)(\alpha_3-\alpha_4)\text{.}$$

Therefore, as it happens with R_{4}(y), P(x) has a multiple root if and only if R_{5}(y) has a multiple root. More precisely, P(x) and R_{5}(y) have the same discriminant. This is also a consequence of the fact that R_{5}(y + a_{2}) = -R_{4}(-y).

Note that if P(x) is a depressed polynomial, then

$$\begin{align}R_5(y)&=y^3-2a_2y^2+({a_2}^2-4a_0)y+{a_1}^2\\ &=-R_3(-y)\\ &=-R_1\left(-\frac y2\right)\text{.}\end{align}$$

== Applications ==
=== Solving quartic equations ===
It was explained above how R_{1}(y), R_{2}(y), and R_{3}(y) can be used to find the roots of P(x) if this polynomial is depressed. In the general case, one simply has to find the roots of the depressed polynomial P(x − a_{3}/4). For each root x_{0} of this polynomial, x_{0} − a_{3}/4 is a root of P(x).

=== Factoring quartic polynomials ===
If a quartic polynomial P(x) is reducible in k[x], then it is the product of two quadratic polynomials or the product of a linear polynomial by a cubic polynomial. This second possibility occurs if and only if P(x) has a root in k. In order to determine whether or not P(x) can be expressed as the product of two quadratic polynomials, let us assume, for simplicity, that P(x) is a depressed polynomial. Then it was seen above that if the resolvent cubic R_{3}(y) has a non-null root of the form α^{2}, for some α ∈ k, then such a decomposition exists.

This can be used to prove that, in R[x], every quartic polynomial without real roots can be expressed as the product of two quadratic polynomials. Let P(x) be such a polynomial. We can assume without loss of generality that P(x) is monic. We can also assume without loss of generality that it is a reduced polynomial, because P(x) can be expressed as the product of two quadratic polynomials if and only if P(x − a_{3}/4) can and this polynomial is a reduced one. Then R_{3}(y) = y^{3} + 2a_{2}y^{2} + (a_{2}^{2} − 4a_{0})y − a_{1}^{2}. There are two cases:

- If a_{1} ≠ 0 then R_{3}(0) = −a_{1}^{2} < 0. Since R_{3}(y) > 0 if y is large enough, then, by the intermediate value theorem, R_{3}(y) has a root y_{0} with y_{0} > 0. So, we can take α = √y_{0}.
- If a_{1} = 0, then R_{3}(y) = y^{3} + 2a_{2}y^{2} + (a_{2}^{2} − 4a_{0})y. The roots of this polynomial are 0 and the roots of the quadratic polynomial y^{2} + 2a_{2}y + a_{2}^{2} − 4a_{0}. If a_{2}^{2} − 4a_{0} < 0, then the product of the two roots of this polynomial is smaller than 0 and therefore it has a root greater than 0 (which happens to be −a_{2} + 2√a_{0}) and we can take α as the square root of that root. Otherwise, a_{2}^{2} − 4a_{0} ≥ 0 and then,

$$P(x)=\left(x^2+\frac{a_2+\sqrt{{a_2}^2-4a_0}}2\right)\left(x^2+\frac{a_2-\sqrt{{a_2}^2-4a_0}}2\right)\text{.}$$

More generally, if k is a real closed field, then every quartic polynomial without roots in k can be expressed as the product of two quadratic polynomials in k[x]. Indeed, this statement can be expressed in first-order logic and any such statement that holds for R also holds for any real closed field.

A similar approach can be used to get an algorithm to determine whether or not a quartic polynomial P(x) ∈ Q[x] is reducible and, if it is, how to express it as a product of polynomials of smaller degree. Again, we will suppose that P(x) is monic and depressed. Then P(x) is reducible if and only if at least one of the following conditions holds:

- The polynomial P(x) has a rational root (this can be determined using the rational root theorem).
- The resolvent cubic R_{3}(y) has a root of the form α^{2}, for some non-null rational number α (again, this can be determined using the rational root theorem).
- The number a_{2}^{2} − 4a_{0} is the square of a rational number and a_{1} = 0.

Indeed:

- If P(x) has a rational root r, then P(x) is the product of x − r by a cubic polynomial in Q[x], which can be determined by polynomial long division or by Ruffini's rule.
- If there is a rational number α ≠ 0 such that α^{2} is a root of R_{3}(y), it was shown above how to express P(x) as the product of two quadratic polynomials in Q[x].
- Finally, if the third condition holds and if δ ∈ Q is such that δ^{2} = a_{2}^{2} − 4a_{0}, then P(x) = (x^{2} + (a_{2} + δ)/2)(x^{2} + (a_{2} − δ)/2).

=== Galois groups of irreducible quartic polynomials ===
The resolvent cubic of an irreducible quartic polynomial P(x) can be used to determine its Galois group G; that is, the Galois group of the splitting field of P(x). Let m be the degree over k of the splitting field of the resolvent cubic (it can be either R_{4}(y) or R_{5}(y); they have the same splitting field). Then the group G is a subgroup of the symmetric group S_{4}. More precisely:

- If m = 1 (that is, if the resolvent cubic factors into linear factors in k), then G is the group {e, (12)(34), (13)(24), (14)(23)}.
- If m = 2 (that is, if the resolvent cubic has one and, up to multiplicity, only one root in k), then, in order to determine G, one can determine whether or not P(x) is still irreducible after adjoining to the field k the roots of the resolvent cubic. If not, then G is a cyclic group of order 4; more precisely, it is one of the three cyclic subgroups of S_{4} generated by any of its six 4-cycles. If it is still irreducible, then G is one of the three subgroups of S_{4} of order 8, each of which is isomorphic to the dihedral group of order 8.
- If m = 3, then G is the alternating group A_{4}.
- If m = 6, then G is the whole group S_{4}.

== See also ==
- Resolvent (Galois theory)
