= Tommaso Boggio =

Italian mathematician (1877–1963)

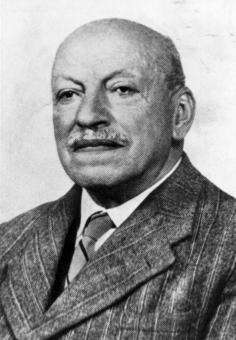
- Born: 22 December 1877; Valperga, Italy
- Died: 25 May 1963 (aged 85); Turin, Italy
- Education: University of Turin
- Known for: Boggio's formula Boggio's Principle; Boggio-Hadamard conjecture
- Scientific career
- Fields: Mathematics
- Workplaces: University of Turin; University of Genoa

Tommaso Boggio (22 December 1877 – 25 May 1963) was an Italian mathematician. Boggio worked in mathematical physics, differential geometry, analysis, and financial mathematics. He was an invited speaker in International Congress of Mathematicians 1908 in Rome. He wrote, with Burali-Forti, Meccanica Razionale, published in 1921 by S. Lattes & Compagnia.
