= Timeline of algebra =

Notable events in the history of algebra

The following is a timeline of key developments of algebra:

Year	Event
c. 1800 BC	An Old Babylonian tablet (Strasbourg 363) seeks the solution of a quadratic equation.
c. 1800 BC	The Plimpton 322 tablet gives a table of Pythagorean triples in Babylonian Cuneiform script.
1800 BC	Berlin Papyrus 6619 (19th dynasty) contains a quadratic equation and its solution.
800 BC	Baudhayana, author of the Baudhayana Sulba Sutra, a Vedic Sanskrit geometric text, contains quadratic equations, and calculates the square root of 2 correct to five decimal places
c. 300 BC	Euclid's Elements gives a geometric construction with Euclidean tools for the solution of the quadratic equation for positive real roots.
c. 300 BC	A geometric construction for the solution of the cubic is sought (doubling the cube problem). It is now well known that the general cubic has no such solution using Euclidean tools.
150 BC	Jain mathematicians in India write the "Sthananga Sutra", which contains work on the theory of numbers, arithmetical operations, geometry, operations with fractions, simple equations, cubic equations, quartic equations, and permutations and combinations.
250 BC	Algebraic equations are treated in the Chinese mathematics book Jiuzhang suanshu (The Nine Chapters on the Mathematical Art), which contains solutions of linear equations solved using the rule of double false position, geometric solutions of quadratic equations, and the solutions of matrices equivalent to the modern method, to solve systems of simultaneous linear equations.
1st century AD	Hero of Alexandria gives the earliest fleeting reference to square roots of negative numbers.
c. 150	Greek mathematician Hero of Alexandria, treats algebraic equations in three volumes of mathematics.
c. 200	Hellenistic mathematician Diophantus, who lived in Alexandria and is often considered to be the "father of algebra", writes his famous Arithmetica, a work featuring solutions of algebraic equations and on the theory of numbers.
499	Indian mathematician Aryabhata, in his treatise Aryabhatiya, obtains whole-number solutions to linear equations, describes the general solution of the indeterminate linear equation.
c. 625	Chinese mathematician Wang Xiaotong finds numerical solutions to certain cubic equations.
c. 7th century Dates vary from the 3rd to the 12th centuries.	The Bakhshali Manuscript written in ancient India uses a form of algebraic notation using letters of the alphabet and other signs, and contains cubic and quartic equations, algebraic solutions of linear equations with up to five unknowns, the general algebraic formula for the quadratic equation, and solutions of indeterminate quadratic equations and simultaneous equations.
7th century	Brahmagupta invents the method of solving indeterminate equations of the second degree . He also develops methods for calculations of the motions and places of various planets, their rising and setting, conjunctions, and the calculation of eclipses of the sun and the moon
628	Brahmagupta writes the Brahmasphuta-siddhanta, where zero is clearly explained, and where the modern place-value Indian numeral system is fully developed. It also gives rules for manipulating both negative and positive numbers, methods for computing square roots, methods of solving linear and quadratic equations, and rules for summing series, Brahmagupta's identity, and the Brahmagupta theorem
8th century	Virasena gives explicit rules for the Fibonacci sequence, gives the derivation of the volume of a frustum using an infinite procedure, and also deals with the logarithm to base 2
c. 800	The Abbasid patrons of learning, al-Mansur, Haroun al-Raschid, and al-Mamun, has Greek, Babylonian, and Indian mathematical and scientific works translated into Arabic and begins a cultural, scientific and mathematical awakening after a century devoid of mathematical achievements.
820	The word algebra is derived from operations described in the treatise written by the Persian mathematician, Muḥammad ibn Mūsā al-Ḵhwārizmī, titled Al-Kitab al-Jabr wa-l-Muqabala (meaning "The Compendious Book on Calculation by Completion and Balancing") on the systematic solution of linear and quadratic equations. Al-Khwarizmi is sometimes credited with the "father of algebra" by some, for treating algebra as an independent discipline and for introducing the methods of "reduction" and "balancing" (the transposition of subtracted terms to the other side of an equation, that is, the cancellation of like terms on opposite sides of the equation) which was what he originally used the term al-jabr to refer to. His algebra was also no longer concerned "with a series of problems to be resolved, but an exposition which starts with primitive terms in which the combinations must give all possible prototypes for equations, which henceforward explicitly constitute the true object of study." He also studied an equation for its own sake and "in a generic manner, insofar as it does not simply emerge in the course of solving a problem, but is specifically called on to define an infinite class of problems."
c. 990	Persian mathematician Al-Karaji (also known as al-Karkhi), in his treatise Al-Fakhri, further develops algebra by extending Al-Khwarizmi's methodology to incorporate integral powers and integral roots of unknown quantities. He replaces geometrical operations of algebra with modern arithmetical operations, and defines the monomials x, x^{2}, x^{3}, .. and 1/x, 1/x^{2}, 1/x^{3}, .. and gives rules for the products of any two of these. He also discovers the first numerical solution to equations of the form ax^{2n} + bx^{n} = c. Al-Karaji is also regarded as the first person to free algebra from geometrical operations and replace them with the type of arithmetic operations which are at the core of algebra today. His work on algebra and polynomials, gave the rules for arithmetic operations to manipulate polynomials. The historian of mathematics F. Woepcke, in Extrait du Fakhri, traité d'Algèbre par Abou Bekr Mohammed Ben Alhacan Alkarkhi (Paris, 1853), praised Al-Karaji for being "the first who introduced the theory of algebraic calculus". Stemming from this, Al-Karaji investigated binomial coefficients and Pascal's triangle.
895	Thabit ibn Qurra: the only surviving fragment of his original work contains a chapter on the solution and properties of cubic equations. He also generalized the Pythagorean theorem, and discovered the theorem by which pairs of amicable numbers can be found, (i.e., two numbers such that each is the sum of the proper divisors of the other).
953	Al-Karaji may be regarded as the first person to free algebra from geometrical operations and to replace them with the arithmetical type of operations which are at the core of algebra today. He defined the monomials $x$, $x^2$, $x^3$, … and $1/x$, $1/x^2$, $1/x^3$, … and to give rules for products of any two of these. He start[s] a school of algebra which flourished for several hundreds of years”. He also discovers the binomial theorem for integer exponents, which “was a major factor in the development of numerical analysis based on the decimal system.”
c. 1000	Abū Sahl al-Qūhī (Kuhi) solves equations higher than the second degree.
c. 1050	Chinese mathematician Jia Xian finds numerical solutions of polynomial equations of arbitrary degree.
1070	Omar Khayyám begins to write Treatise on Demonstration of Problems of Algebra and classifies cubic equations.
1072	Persian mathematician Omar Khayyám gives a complete classification of cubic equations with positive roots and gives general geometric solutions to these equations found by means of intersecting conic sections.
12th century	Bhaskara Acharya writes the “Bijaganita” (“Algebra”), which is the first text that recognizes that a positive number has two square roots
1130	Al-Samawal gives a definition of algebra: “[it is concerned] with operating on unknowns using all the arithmetical tools, in the same way as the arithmetician operates on the known.”
c. 1200	Sharaf al-Dīn al-Tūsī (1135–1213) writes the Al-Mu'adalat (Treatise on Equations), which deals with eight types of cubic equations with positive solutions and five types of cubic equations which may not have positive solutions. He uses what would later be known as the "Ruffini–Horner method" to numerically approximate the root of a cubic equation. He also develops the concepts of the maxima and minima of curves in order to solve cubic equations which may not have positive solutions. He understands the importance of the discriminant of the cubic equation and uses an early version of Cardano's formula to find algebraic solutions to certain types of cubic equations. Some scholars, such as Roshdi Rashed, argue that Sharaf al-Din discovered the derivative of cubic polynomials and realized its significance, while other scholars connect his solution to the ideas of Euclid and Archimedes.
1202	Leonardo Fibonacci of Pisa publishes his Liber Abaci, a work on algebra that introduces Arabic numerals to Europe.
c. 1300	Chinese mathematician Zhu Shijie deals with polynomial algebra, solves quadratic equations, simultaneous equations and equations with up to four unknowns, and numerically solves some quartic, quintic and higher-order polynomial equations.
c. 1400	Indian mathematician Madhava of Sangamagrama documents infinite series approximations of trigonometry functions.
15th century	Nilakantha Somayaji, a Kerala school mathematician, writes the “Aryabhatiya Bhasya”, which contains work on infinite-series expansions, problems of algebra, and spherical geometry
1412–1482	Arab mathematician Abū al-Hasan ibn Alī al-Qalasādī takes "the first steps toward the introduction of algebraic symbolism." He uses "short Arabic words, or just their initial letters, as mathematical symbols."
1535	Scipione del Ferro and Niccolò Fontana Tartaglia, in Italy, independently solve the general cubic equation.
1545	Girolamo Cardano publishes Ars magna -The great art which gives del Ferro's solution to the cubic equation and Lodovico Ferrari's solution to the quartic equation.
1572	Rafael Bombelli recognizes the complex roots of the cubic and improves current notation.
1591	Franciscus Vieta develops improved symbolic notation for various powers of an unknown and uses vowels for unknowns and consonants for constants in In artem analyticum isagoge.
1608	Christopher Clavius publishes his Algebra
1619	René Descartes discovers analytic geometry. (Pierre de Fermat claimed that he also discovered it independently.)
1631	Thomas Harriot in a posthumous publication is the first to use symbols < and > to indicate "less than" and "greater than", respectively.
1637	Pierre de Fermat claims to have proven Fermat's Last Theorem in his copy of Diophantus' Arithmetica,
1637	René Descartes introduces the use of the letters z, y, and x for unknown quantities.
1637	The term imaginary number is first used by René Descartes; it is meant to be derogatory.
1682	Gottfried Wilhelm Leibniz develops his notion of symbolic manipulation with formal rules which he calls characteristica generalis.
1683	Japanese mathematician Kowa Seki, in his Method of solving the dissimulated problems, discovers the determinant, discriminant, and Bernoulli numbers.
1693	Leibniz solves systems of simultaneous linear equations using matrices and determinants.
1722	Abraham de Moivre states de Moivre's formula connecting trigonometric functions and complex numbers,
1750	Gabriel Cramer, in his treatise Introduction to the analysis of algebraic curves, states Cramer's rule and studies algebraic curves, matrices and determinants.
1797	Caspar Wessel associates vectors with complex numbers and studies complex number operations in geometrical terms,
1799	Carl Friedrich Gauss proves the fundamental theorem of algebra (every polynomial equation has a solution among the complex numbers),
1799	Paolo Ruffini partially proves the Abel–Ruffini theorem that quintic or higher equations cannot be solved by a general formula,
1806	Jean-Robert Argand publishes proof of the Fundamental theorem of algebra and the Argand diagram,
1824	Niels Henrik Abel proves that the general quintic equation is insoluble by radicals.
1832	Galois theory is developed by Évariste Galois in his work on abstract algebra.
1843	William Rowan Hamilton discovers quaternions.
1853	Arthur Cayley provides a modern definition of groups.
1847	George Boole formalizes symbolic logic in The Mathematical Analysis of Logic, defining what now is called Boolean algebra.
1873	Charles Hermite proves that e is transcendental.
1878	Charles Hermite solves the general quintic equation by means of elliptic and modular functions.
1926	Emmy Noether extends Hilbert's theorem on the finite basis problem to representations of a finite group over any field.
1929	Emmy Noether combines work on structure theory of associative algebras and the representation theory of groups into a single arithmetic theory of modules and ideals in rings satisfying ascending chain conditions, providing the foundation for modern algebra.
1981	Mikhail Gromov develops the theory of hyperbolic groups, revolutionizing both infinite group theory and global differential geometry,

== See also ==
- History of algebra – Historical development of algebra
