= Al-Jabr =

9th-century Arabic work on algebra

The Concise Book of Calculation by Restoration and Balancing
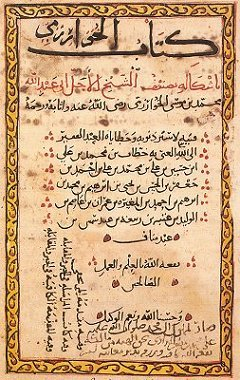
- Title page, 9th century
- Author: Muhammad ibn Musa al-Khwarizmi
- Original title: كتاب المختصر في حساب الجبر والمقابلة
- Illustrator: Muhammad ibn Musa al-Khwarizmi
- Language: Arabic
- Subject: Algebra
- Publication date: 820
- Publication place: Abbasid Caliphate
- Original text: كتاب المختصر في حساب الجبر والمقابلة at Arabic Wikisource
- Translation: The Concise Book of Calculation by Restoration and Balancing at Wikisource

The Concise Book of Calculation by Restoration and Balancing (Arabic: الكتاب المختصر في حساب الجبر والمقابلة, al-Kitāb al-Mukhtaṣar fī Ḥisāb al-Jabr wal-Muqābalah; (Note: The Arabic title is sometimes condensed to Ḥisāb al-Jabr wal-Muqābalah or Kitāb al-Jabr wal-Muqābalah or given under other transliterations.) or Latin: Liber Algebræ et Almucabola), commonly abbreviated Al-Jabr or Algebra (Arabic: الجبر), is an Arabic-language mathematical treatise on algebra written in Baghdad around 820 by persian mathematician Al-Khwarizmi. It was a landmark work in the history of mathematics, with its title being the ultimate etymology of the word "algebra" itself, later borrowed into Medieval Latin as algebrāica.

Al-Jabr provided an exhaustive account of solving for the positive roots of polynomial equations up to the second degree. (Note: "The Arabs in general loved a good clear argument from premise to conclusion, as well as systematic organization – respects in which neither Diophantus nor the Hindus excelled.") It was the first text to teach elementary algebra, and the first to teach algebra for its own sake. (Note: "In a sense, Khwarizmi is more entitled to be called "the father of algebra" than Diophantus because Khwarizmi is the first to teach algebra in an elementary form and for its own sake, Diophantus is primarily concerned with the theory of numbers".) It also introduced the fundamental concepts of "restoration" or "completion" (al-jabr), meaning the transposition of terms to the other side of an equation by subtraction, and "reduction" or "balancing" (muqābalah), the cancellation of like terms on both sides. (Note: "It is not certain just what the terms al-jabr and muqābalah mean, but the usual interpretation is similar to that implied in the translation above. The word al-jabr presumably meant something like "restoration" or "completion" and seems to refer to the transposition of subtracted terms to the other side of an equation, which is evident in the treatise; the word muq︎ābalah is said to refer to "reduction" or "balancing"—that is, the cancellation of like terms on opposite sides of the equation.") The mathematics historian Victor J. Katz regards Al-Jabr as the first true algebra text that is still extant. (Note: "The first true algebra text which is still extant is the work on al-jabr and al-muqabala by Mohammad ibn Musa al-Khwarizmi, written in Baghdad around 825.") Translated into Latin by Robert of Chester in 1145, it was used until the sixteenth century as the principal mathematical textbook of European universities. (Note: "The Compendious Book on Calculation by Completion and Balancing" (Hisab al-Jabr wa H-Muqabala) on the development of the subject cannot be underestimated. Translated into Latin during the twelfth century, it remained the principal mathematics textbook in European universities until the sixteenth century")

Several authors have also published texts under this name, including Abu Hanifa Dinawari, Abu Kamil, Abū Muḥammad al-ʿAdlī, Abū Yūsuf al-Miṣṣīṣī, 'Abd al-Hamīd ibn Turk, Sind ibn ʿAlī, Sahl ibn Bišr, and Šarafaddīn al-Ṭūsī.

== Content ==
The book was a compilation and extension of known rules for solving quadratic equations and for some other problems, and considered to be the foundation of algebra, establishing it as an independent discipline. The word algebra is derived from the name of one of the basic operations with equations described in this book, following its Latin translation by Robert of Chester.

== Quadratic equations ==
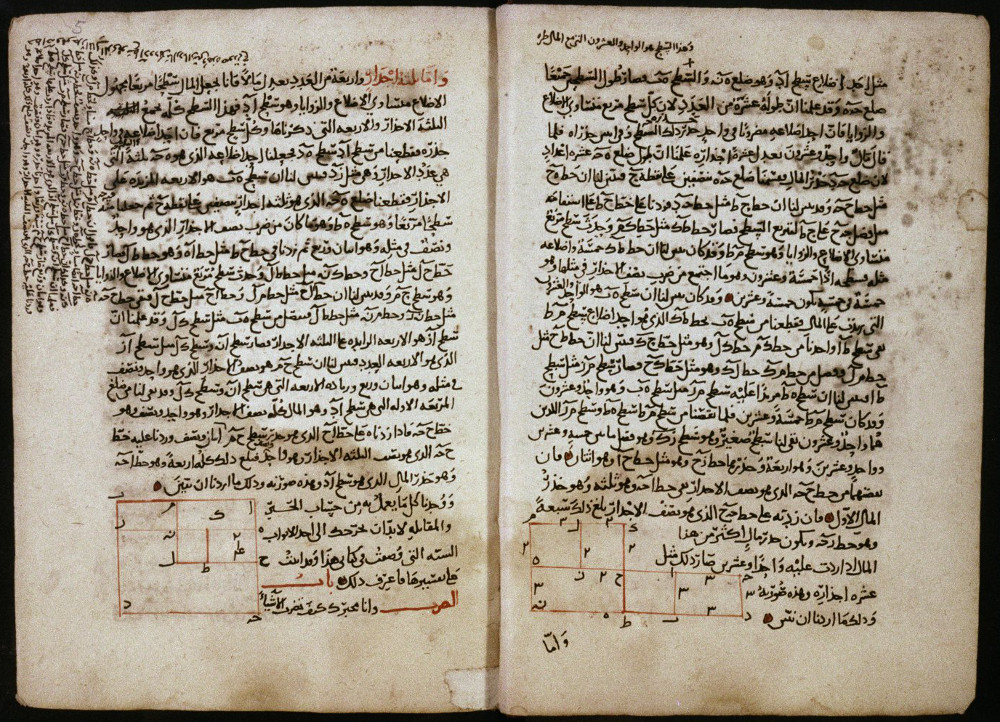
Pages from a 14th-century Arabic copy of the book, showing geometric solutions to two quadratic equations.

The book classifies quadratic equations to one of the six basic types and provides algebraic and geometric methods to solve the basic ones. Historian Carl Boyer notes the following regarding the lack of modern abstract notations in the book:

... the algebra of al-Khwarizmi is thoroughly rhetorical, with none of the syncopation (see History of algebra) found in the Greek Arithmetica or in Brahmagupta's work. Even the numbers were written out in words rather than symbols!

— Carl B. Boyer, A History of Mathematics

Thus the equations are verbally described in terms of "squares" (what would today be "x^{2}"), "roots" (what would today be "x") and "numbers" ("constants": ordinary spelled out numbers, like 'forty-two'). The six types, with modern notations, are:

| 1. | squares equal roots | $ax^2 = bx$ |
| 2. | squares equal number | $ax^2 = c$ |
| 3. | roots equal number | $bx = c$ |
| 4. | squares and roots equal number | $ax^2+bx = c$ |
| 5. | squares and number equal roots | $ax^2+c = bx$ |
| 6. | roots and number equal squares | $bx+c = ax^2$ |

Islamic mathematicians, unlike the Hindus, did not deal with negative numbers at all; hence an equation like bx + c = 0 does not appear in the classification, because it has no positive solutions if all the coefficients are positive. Similarly equation types 4, 5 and 6, which look equivalent to the modern eye, were distinguished because the coefficients must all be positive.

Al-Jabr ("forcing", "restoring") operation is moving a deficient quantity from one side of the equation to the other side. In an al-Khwarizmi's example (in modern notation), "x^{2} = 40x − 4x^{2}" is transformed by al-Jabr into "5x^{2} = 40x". Repeated application of this rule eliminates negative quantities from calculations.

Al-Muqābala (المقابله, "balancing" or "corresponding") means subtraction of the same positive quantity from both sides: "x^{2} + 5 = 40x + 4x^{2}" is turned into "5 = 40x + 3x^{2}". Repeated application of this rule makes quantities of each type ("square"/"root"/"number") appear in the equation at most once, which helps to see that there are only 6 basic solvable types of the problem, when restricted to positive coefficients and solutions.

Subsequent parts of the book do not rely on solving quadratic equations.

== Area and volume ==
The second chapter of the book catalogues methods of finding area and volume. These include approximations of pi (π), given three ways, as $3 \tfrac17$, $\sqrt{10}$, and $62832/20000$. This latter approximation, equalling 3.1416, earlier appeared in the Indian Āryabhaṭīya (499 CE).

== Other topics ==
Al-Khwārizmī explicates the Jewish calendar and the 19-year cycle described by the convergence of lunar months and solar years.

About half of the book deals with Islamic rules of inheritance, which are complex and require skill in first-order algebraic equations.

== Legacy ==
Al-Jabr introduced balancing and reduction to mathematical expressions, and founded Algebra as an independent mathematical discipline, which is taught worldwide, typically as part of an elementary and high school curriculum.

R. Rashed and Angela Armstrong write:

Al-Khwarizmi's text can be seen to be distinct not only from the Babylonian tablets, but also from the Diophantus' Arithmetica. It no longer concerns a series of problems to be resolved, but an exposition which starts with primitive terms in which the combinations must give all possible prototypes for equations, which henceforward explicitly constitute the true object of study. On the other hand, the idea of an equation for its own sake appears from the beginning and, one could say, in a generic manner, insofar as it does not simply emerge in the course of solving a problem, but is specifically called on to define an infinite class of problems.

J. J. O'Connor and E. F. Robertson wrote in the MacTutor History of Mathematics Archive:

Perhaps one of the most significant advances made by Arabic mathematics began at this time with the work of al-Khwarizmi, namely the beginnings of algebra. It is important to understand just how significant this new idea was. It was a revolutionary move away from the Greek concept of mathematics which was essentially geometry. Algebra was a unifying theory which allowed rational numbers, irrational numbers, geometrical magnitudes, etc., to all be treated as "algebraic objects". It gave mathematics a whole new development path so much broader in concept to that which had existed before, and provided a vehicle for future development of the subject. Another important aspect of the introduction of algebraic ideas was that it allowed mathematics to be applied to itself in a way which had not happened before.
