= A history of mathematics =

A history of mathematics may refer to:

- A history of mathematics (Cajori), a book by Florian Cajori in 1893
- A history of mathematics (Boyer), a book by Carl Benjamin Boyer in 1968
