= Mathematics in the medieval Islamic world =

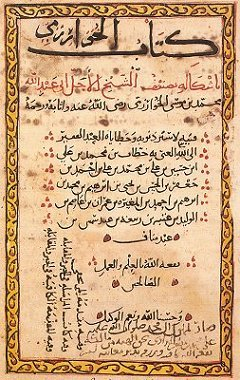
A page from The Compendious Book on Calculation by Completion and Balancing by Al-Khwarizmi

Mathematics during the Golden Age of Islam, especially during the 9th and 10th centuries, was built upon syntheses of Greek mathematics (Euclid, Archimedes, Apollonius) and Indian mathematics (Aryabhata, Brahmagupta). Important developments of the period include extension of the place-value system to include decimal fractions, the systematised study of algebra and advances in geometry and trigonometry.

The medieval Islamic world underwent significant developments in mathematics. Muhammad ibn Musa al-Khwārizmī played a key role in this transformation, introducing algebra as a distinct field in the 9th century. Al-Khwārizmī's approach, departing from earlier arithmetical traditions, laid the groundwork for the arithmetization of algebra, influencing mathematical thought for an extended period. Successors like Al-Karaji expanded on his work, contributing to advancements in various mathematical domains. The practicality and broad applicability of these mathematical methods facilitated the dissemination of Arabic mathematics to the West, contributing substantially to the evolution of Western mathematics.

Arabic mathematical knowledge spread through various channels during the medieval era, driven by the practical applications of Al-Khwārizmī's methods. This dissemination was influenced not only by economic and political factors but also by cultural exchanges, exemplified by events such as the Crusades and the translation movement. The Islamic Golden Age, spanning from the 8th to the 14th century, marked a period of considerable advancements in various scientific disciplines, attracting scholars from medieval Europe seeking access to this knowledge. Trade routes and cultural interactions played a crucial role in introducing Arabic mathematical ideas to the West. The translation of Arabic mathematical texts, along with Greek and Roman works, during the 14th to 17th century, played a pivotal role in shaping the intellectual landscape of the Renaissance.

== Origin and spread of Arab-Islamic mathematics ==
Arabic mathematics, particularly algebra, developed significantly during the medieval period. Muhammad ibn Musa al-Khwārizmī's (Arabic: محمد بن موسى الخوارزمي; c. 780 – c. 850) work between AD 813 and 833 in Baghdad was a turning point. He introduced the term "algebra" in the title of his book, "Kitab al-jabr wa al-muqabala," marking it as a distinct discipline. He regarded his work as "a short work on Calculation by (the rules of) Completion and Reduction, confining it to what is easiest and most useful in arithmetic".

Al-Khwārizmī's approach was groundbreaking in that it did not arise from any previous "arithmetical" tradition, including that of Diophantus. He developed a new vocabulary for algebra, distinguishing between purely algebraic terms and those shared with arithmetic. Al-Khwārizmī noticed that the representation of numbers is crucial in daily life. Thus, he wanted to find or summarize a way to simplify the mathematical operation, so-called later, the algebra. His algebra was initially focused on linear and quadratic equations and the elementary arithmetic of binomials and trinomials. This approach, which involved solving equations using radicals and related algebraic calculations, influenced mathematical thinking long after his death.

Al-Khwārizmī's proof of the rule for solving quadratic equations of the form (ax^{2} + bx = c), commonly referred to as "squares plus roots equal numbers," was a ground-breaking achievement in the history of algebra. This breakthrough laid the groundwork for the systematic approach to solving quadratic equations, which became a fundamental aspect of algebra as it developed in the Western world. Al-Khwārizmī's method, which involved completing the square, not only provided a practical solution for equations of this type but also introduced an abstract and generalized approach to mathematical problems. His work, encapsulated in his seminal text "Al-Kitab al-Mukhtasar fi Hisab al-Jabr wal-Muqabala" (The Compendious Book on Calculation by Completion and Balancing), was translated into Latin in the 12th century. This translation played a pivotal role in the transmission of algebraic knowledge to Europe, significantly influencing mathematicians during the Renaissance and shaping the evolution of modern mathematics.

The spread of Arabic mathematics to the West was facilitated by several factors. The practicality and broad applicability of al-Khwārizmī's methods were especially notable. These methods converted numerical and geometrical problems into equations in standard form, leading to canonical solution formulae. His work, along with that of successors like al-Karaji, laid the groundwork for advances in various mathematical fields, including number theory, numerical analysis, and rational Diophantine analysis.

Al-Khwārizmī's algebra was an autonomous discipline with its historical perspective, eventually leading to the "arithmetization of algebra". His successors expanded on his work, adapting it to new theoretical and technical challenges and reorienting it towards a more arithmetical direction for abstract algebraic calculation.

Arabic mathematics was crucial in shaping the mathematical landscape. Its spread to the West greatly influenced Western mathematics.

The period known as the Islamic Golden Age (8th to 14th century) was characterized by significant advancements in various fields, including mathematics. Scholars in the Islamic world made substantial contributions to mathematics, astronomy, medicine, and other sciences. As a result, the intellectual achievements of Islamic scholars attracted the attention of scholars in medieval Europe who sought to access this wealth of knowledge. Trade routes, such as the Silk Road, facilitated the movement of goods, ideas, and knowledge between the East and West. Cities like Baghdad, Cairo, and Cordoba became centers of learning and attracted scholars from different cultural backgrounds. Therefore, mathematical knowledge from the Islamic world found its way to Europe through various channels. Meanwhile, the Crusades connected Western Europeans with the Islamic world. While the primary purpose of the Crusades was military, there was also cultural exchange and exposure to Islamic knowledge, including mathematics. European scholars who traveled to the Holy Land and other parts of the Islamic world gained access to Arabic manuscripts and mathematical treatises. During the 14th to 17th century, the translation of Arabic mathematical texts, along with Greek and Roman ones, played a crucial role in shaping the intellectual landscape of the Renaissance. Figures like Fibonacci, who studied in North Africa and the Middle East, helped introduce and popularize Arabic numerals and mathematical concepts in Europe.

== Concepts ==
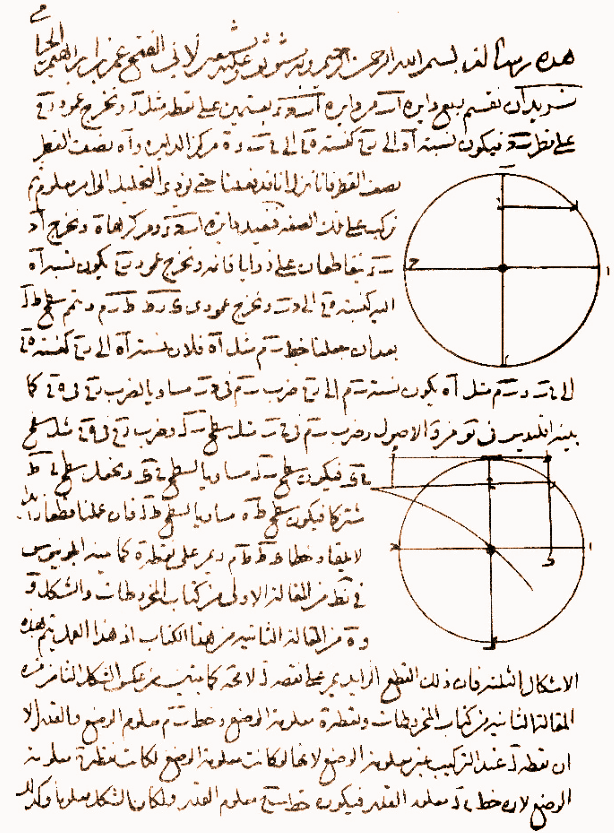
Omar Khayyám's "Cubic equations and intersections of conic sections" the first page of the two-chaptered manuscript kept in Tehran University

=== Algebra ===
The study of algebra, the name of which is derived from the Arabic word meaning completion or "reunion of broken parts", flourished during the Islamic golden age. Muhammad ibn Musa al-Khwarizmi, an Iranian scholar in the House of Wisdom in Baghdad was the founder of algebra, is along with the Greek mathematician Diophantus, known as the father of algebra. In his book The Compendious Book on Calculation by Completion and Balancing, Al-Khwarizmi deals with ways to solve for the positive roots of first and second-degree (linear and quadratic) polynomial equations. He introduces the method of reduction, and unlike Diophantus, also gives general solutions for the equations he deals with.

Al-Khwarizmi's algebra was rhetorical, which means that the equations were written out in full sentences. This was unlike the algebraic work of Diophantus, which was syncopated, meaning that some symbolism is used. The transition to symbolic algebra, where only symbols are used, can be seen in the work of Ibn al-Banna' al-Marrakushi and Abū al-Ḥasan ibn ʿAlī al-Qalaṣādī.

On the work done by Al-Khwarizmi, J. J. O'Connor and Edmund F. Robertson said:

"Perhaps one of the most significant advances made by Arabic mathematics began at this time with the work of al-Khwarizmi, namely the beginnings of algebra. It is important to understand just how significant this new idea was. It was a revolutionary move away from the Greek concept of mathematics which was essentially geometry. Algebra was a unifying theory which allowed rational numbers, irrational numbers, geometrical magnitudes, etc., to all be treated as "algebraic objects". It gave mathematics a whole new development path so much broader in concept to that which had existed before, and provided a vehicle for the future development of the subject. Another important aspect of the introduction of algebraic ideas was that it allowed mathematics to be applied to itself in a way which had not happened before."

— MacTutor History of Mathematics archive

Several other mathematicians during this time period expanded on the algebra of Al-Khwarizmi. Abu Kamil Shuja' wrote a book of algebra accompanied with geometrical illustrations and proofs. He also enumerated all the possible solutions to some of his problems. Abu al-Jud, Omar Khayyam, along with Sharaf al-Dīn al-Tūsī, found several solutions of the cubic equation. Omar Khayyam found the general geometric solution of a cubic equation.

=== Cubic equations ===
To solve the third-degree equation x^{3} + a^{2}x = b Khayyám constructed the parabola x^{2} = ay, a circle with diameter b/a^{2}, and a vertical line through the intersection point. The solution is given by the length of the horizontal line segment from the origin to the intersection of the vertical line and the x-axis.

Omar Khayyam (c. 1038/48 in Iran – 1123/24) wrote the Treatise on Demonstration of Problems of Algebra containing the systematic solution of cubic or third-order equations, going beyond the Algebra of al-Khwārizmī. Khayyám obtained the solutions of these equations by finding the intersection points of two conic sections. This method had been used by the Greeks, but they did not generalize the method to cover all equations with positive roots.

Sharaf al-Dīn al-Ṭūsī (? in Tus, Iran – 1213/4) developed a novel approach to the investigation of cubic equations—an approach which entailed finding the point at which a cubic polynomial obtains its maximum value. For example, to solve the equation $\ x^3 + a = b x$, with a and b positive, he would note that the maximum point of the curve $\ y = b x - x^3$ occurs at $x = \textstyle\sqrt{\frac{b}{3}}$, and that the equation would have no solutions, one solution or two solutions, depending on whether the height of the curve at that point was less than, equal to, or greater than a. His surviving works give no indication of how he discovered his formulae for the maxima of these curves. Various conjectures have been proposed to account for his discovery of them.

=== Induction ===
The earliest implicit traces of mathematical induction can be found in Euclid's proof that the number of primes is infinite (c. 300 BCE). The first explicit formulation of the principle of induction was given by Pascal in his Traité du triangle arithmétique (1665).

In between, implicit proof by induction for arithmetic sequences was introduced by al-Karaji (c. 1000) and continued by al-Samaw'al, who used it for special cases of the binomial theorem and properties of Pascal's triangle.

=== Irrational numbers ===
The Greeks had discovered irrational numbers, but were not happy with them and only able to cope by drawing a distinction between magnitude and number. In the Greek view, magnitudes varied continuously and could be used for entities such as line segments, whereas numbers were discrete. Hence, irrationals could only be handled geometrically; and indeed Greek mathematics was mainly geometrical. Islamic mathematicians including Abū Kāmil Shujāʿ ibn Aslam and Ibn Tahir al-Baghdadi slowly removed the distinction between magnitude and number, allowing irrational quantities to appear as coefficients in equations and to be solutions of algebraic equations. They worked freely with irrationals as mathematical objects, but they did not examine closely their nature.

In the twelfth century, Latin translations of Al-Khwarizmi's Arithmetic on the Indian numerals introduced the decimal positional number system to the Western world. His Compendious Book on Calculation by Completion and Balancing presented the first systematic solution of linear and quadratic equations. In Renaissance Europe, he was considered the original inventor of algebra, although it is now known that his work is based on older Indian or Greek sources. He revised Ptolemy's Geography and wrote on astronomy and astrology. However, C.A. Nallino suggests that al-Khwarizmi's original work was not based on Ptolemy but on a derivative world map, presumably in Syriac or Arabic.

=== Spherical trigonometry ===
The spherical law of sines was discovered in the 10th century: it has been attributed variously to Abu-Mahmud Khojandi, Nasir al-Din al-Tusi and Abu Nasr Mansur, with Abu al-Wafa' Buzjani as a contributor. Ibn Muʿādh al-Jayyānī's The book of unknown arcs of a sphere in the 11th century introduced the general law of sines. The plane law of sines was described in the 13th century by Nasīr al-Dīn al-Tūsī. In his On the Sector Figure, he stated the law of sines for plane and spherical triangles and provided proofs for this law.

=== Negative numbers ===
In the 9th century, Islamic mathematicians were familiar with negative numbers from the works of Indian mathematicians, but the recognition and use of negative numbers during this period remained timid. Al-Khwarizmi did not use negative numbers or negative coefficients. But within fifty years, Abu Kamil illustrated the rules of signs for expanding the multiplication $(a \pm b)(c \pm d)$. Al-Karaji wrote in his book al-Fakhrī that "negative quantities must be counted as terms". In the 10th century, Abū al-Wafā' al-Būzjānī considered debts as negative numbers in A Book on What Is Necessary from the Science of Arithmetic for Scribes and Businessmen.

By the 12th century, al-Karaji's successors were to state the general rules of signs and use them to solve polynomial divisions. As al-Samaw'al writes:

the product of a negative number—al-nāqiṣ—by a positive number—al-zāʾid—is negative, and by a negative number is positive. If we subtract a negative number from a higher negative number, the remainder is their negative difference. The difference remains positive if we subtract a negative number from a lower negative number. If we subtract a negative number from a positive number, the remainder is their positive sum. If we subtract a positive number from an empty power (martaba khāliyya), the remainder is the same negative, and if we subtract a negative number from an empty power, the remainder is the same positive number.

=== Double false position ===
Between the 9th and 10th centuries, the Egyptian mathematician Abu Kamil wrote a now-lost treatise on the use of double false position, known as the Book of the Two Errors (Kitāb al-khaṭāʾayn). The oldest surviving writing on double false position from the Middle East is that of Qusta ibn Luqa (10th century), an Arab mathematician from Baalbek, Lebanon. He justified the technique by a formal, Euclidean-style geometric proof. Within the tradition of Golden Age Muslim mathematics, double false position was known as hisāb al-khaṭāʾayn ("reckoning by two errors"). It was used for centuries to solve practical problems such as commercial and juridical questions (estate partitions according to rules of Quranic inheritance), as well as purely recreational problems. The algorithm was often memorized with the aid of mnemonics, such as a verse attributed to Ibn al-Yasamin and balance-scale diagrams explained by al-Hassar and Ibn al-Banna, who were each mathematicians of Moroccan origin.

== Influences ==
The influence of medieval Arab-Islamic mathematics to the rest of the world is wide and profound, in both the realm of science and mathematics. The knowledge of the Arabs went into the western world through Spain and Sicily during the translation movement. "The Moors (western Mohammedans from that part of North Africa once known as Mauritania) crossed over into Spain early in the seventh century, bringing with them the cultural resources of the Arab world". In the 13th century, King Alfonso X of Castile established the Toledo School of Translators, in the Kingdom of Castile, where scholars translated numerous scientific and philosophical works from Arabic into Latin. The translations included Islamic contributions to trigonometry, which helps European mathematicians and astronomers in their studies. European scholars such as Gerard of Cremona (1114–1187) played a key role in translating and disseminating these works, thus making them accessible to a wider audience. Cremona is said to have translated into Latin "no fewer than 90 complete Arabic texts." European mathematicians, building on the foundations laid by Islamic scholars, further developed practical trigonometry for applications in navigation, cartography, and celestial navigation, thus pushing forward the age of discovery and scientific revolution. The practical applications of trigonometry for navigation and astronomy became increasingly important during the Age of Exploration.

Al-Battānī is one of the islamic mathematicians who made great contributions to the development of trigonometry. He "innovated new trigonometric functions, created a table of cotangents, and made some formulas in spherical trigonometry." These discoveries, together with his astronomical works which are praised for their accuracy, greatly advanced astronomical calculations and instruments.

Al-Khayyām (1048–1131) was a Persian mathematician, astronomer, and poet, known for his work on algebra and geometry, particularly his investigations into the solutions of cubic equations. He was "the first in history to elaborate a geometrical theory of equations with degrees ≤ 3", and has great influence on the work of Descartes, a French mathematician who is often regarded as the founder of analytical geometry. Indeed, "to read Descartes' Géométrie is to look upstream towards al-Khayyām and al-Ṭūsī; and downstream towards Newton, Leibniz, Cramer, Bézout and the Bernoulli brothers". Numerous problems that appear in "La Géométrie" (Geometry) have foundations that date back to al-Khayyām.

Abū Kāmil (Arabic: أبو كامل شجاع بن أسلم بن محمد بن شجاع, also known as Al-ḥāsib al-miṣrī—lit. "The Egyptian Calculator") (c. 850 – c. 930), was studied algebra following the author of Algebra, al-Khwārizmī. His Book of Algebra (Kitāb fī al-jabr wa al-muqābala) is "essentially a commentary on and elaboration of al-Khwārizmī's work; in part for that reason and in part for its own merit, the book enjoyed widespread popularity in the Muslim world". It contains 69 problems, which is more than al-Khwārizmī who had 40 in his book. Abū Kāmil's Algebra plays a significant role in shaping the trajectory of Western mathematics, particularly in its impact on the works of the Italian mathematician Leonardo of Pisa, widely recognized as Fibonacci. In his Liber Abaci (1202), Fibonacci extensively incorporated ideas from Arabic mathematicians, using approximately 29 problems from Book of Algebra with scarce modification.

== Western historians' perception of the contribution of Arab mathematicians ==
Despite the fundamental works Arabic mathematicians have done on the development of Algebra and algebraic geometry, Western historians in the 18th and early 19th century still regarded it as a fact that Classical science and math were unique phenomena of the West. Even though some math contributions from Arab mathematicians are occasionally acknowledged, they are considered to be "outside history or only integrated in so far as it contributed to science, which is essentially European", and just some technical innovations to the Greek heritage rather than open up a completely new branch of mathematics. In the French philosopher Ernest Renan's work, Arabic math is merely "a reflection of Greece, combined with Persian and Indian influences". And according to Duhem, "Arabic science only reproduced the teachings received from Greek science". Besides being considered as merely some insignificant additions or reflections to the great tradition of Greek classical science, math works from Arabic mathematicians are also blamed for lacking rigor and too focused on practical applications and calculations, and this is why Western historians argued they could never reach the level of Greek mathematicians. As Tannery wrote, Arabic math "in no way superseded the level attained by Diophantus". On the other hand, they perceived that Western mathematicians went into a very different way both in its method employed and ultimate purpose, "the hallmark of Western science in its Greek origins as well as in its modern renaissance, is its conformity to rigorous standards". Thus, the perceived non-rigorous proof in Arabic mathematicians' book authorizes Bourbaki to exclude the Arabic period when he retraced the evolution of algebra. And instead, the history of classical algebra is written as the work of the Renaissance and the origin of algebraic geometry is traced back to Descartes, while Arabic mathematicians' contributions are ignored. In Rashed's words: "To justify the exclusion of science written in Arabic from the history of science, one invokes its absence of rigor, its calculatory appearance and its practical aims. Furthermore, strictly dependent on Greek science and, lastly, incapable of introducing experimental norms, scientists of that time were relegated to the role of conscientious guardians of the Hellenistic museum."

In 18th century Germany and France, the prevailing Orientalist view was "East and West oppose each other not as geographical but as historical positivities", which labeled "Rationalism" as the essence of the West, while the "Call of the Orient" movement emerged in the 19th century was interpreted as "against Rationalism" and a return to a more "spiritual and harmonious" lifestyle. Thus, the prevailing Orientalism in that period was one of the main reasons why Arabic mathematicians were often ignored for their contributions, as people outside the West were considered to be lacking the necessary rationality and scientific spirit to made significant contributions to math and science.

== Other major figures ==
- 'Abd al-Hamīd ibn Turk (fl. 830) (quadratics)
- Sind ibn Ali (d. after 864)
- Thabit ibn Qurra (826–901)
- Al-Battānī (before 858 – 929)
- Abū Kāmil (c. 850 – c. 930)
- Abu'l-Hasan al-Uqlidisi (fl. 952) (arithmetic)
- 'Abd al-'Aziz al-Qabisi (d. 967)
- Abū Sahl al-Qūhī (c. 940–1000) (centres of gravity)
- Ibn al-Haytham (c. 965–1040)
- Abū al-Rayḥān al-Bīrūnī (973–1048) (trigonometry)
- Al-Khayyām (1048–1131)
- Ibn Maḍāʾ (c. 1116–1196)
- Ismail al-Jazari (1136–1206)
- Jamshīd al-Kāshī (c. 1380–1429) (decimals and estimation of the circle constant)

== Gallery ==
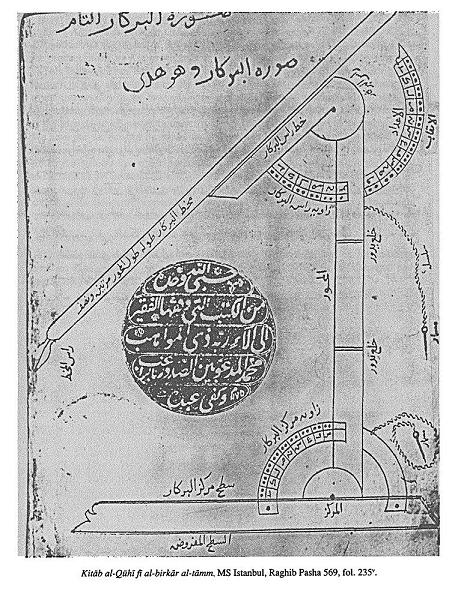
Engraving of Abū Sahl al-Qūhī's perfect compass to draw conic sections

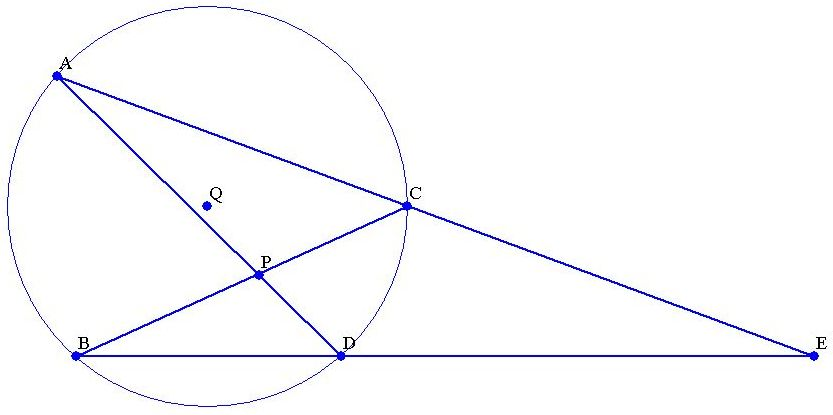
The theorem of Ibn Haytham

== See also ==
- Arabic numerals
- Indian influence on Islamic mathematics in medieval Islam
- History of calculus
- History of geometry
- Science in the medieval Islamic world
- Timeline of science and engineering in the Muslim world

== Sources ==
- Berggren, J. Lennart (2007). "Mathematics in Medieval Islam". In Victor J. Katz (ed.). The Mathematics of Egypt, Mesopotamia, China, India, and Islam: A Sourcebook (2nd ed.). Princeton, New Jersey: Princeton University Press. ISBN 978-0-691-11485-9.
- Boyer, Carl B. (1991), "Greek Trigonometry and Mensuration, and The Arabic Hegemony", A History of Mathematics (2nd ed.), New York City: John Wiley & Sons, ISBN 0-471-54397-7
- Katz, Victor J. (1993). A History of Mathematics: An Introduction. HarperCollins college publishers. ISBN 0-673-38039-4.
- Nallino, C.A. (1939), "Al-Ḥuwārismī e il suo rifacimento della Geografia di Tolomeo", Raccolta di scritti editi e inediti (in Italian), vol. V, Rome: Istituto per l'Oriente, pp. 458–532
- Rosen, Fredrick (1831). The Algebra of Mohammed Ben Musa. Kessinger Publishing. ISBN 1-4179-4914-7.
- Smith, David E. (1958). History of Mathematics. Dover Publications. ISBN 0-486-20429-4.
- Struik, Dirk J. (1987), A Concise History of Mathematics (4th rev. ed.), Dover Publications, ISBN 0-486-60255-9
