= Carl Benjamin Boyer =

American mathematician and historian (1906–1976)

- Born: November 3, 1906; Hellertown, Pennsylvania, U.S.
- Died: April 26, 1976 (aged 69); Brooklyn, New York, U.S.
- Known for: Books on the history of mathematics

Academic background
- Education: Columbia University

Academic work
- Discipline: History of mathematics
- Institutions: Brooklyn College

Carl Benjamin Boyer (November 3, 1906 – April 26, 1976) was an American historian of mathematics, dubbed the "Gibbon of math history" by novelist David Foster Wallace. He was one of few historians of mathematics of his time to "keep open links with contemporary history of science."

== Early life and education ==
Boyer was born in Hellertown, Pennsylvania, on November 3, 1906, and graduated as valedictorian of his high school class. He received a bachelor's degree from Columbia College in 1928 and started working as a tutor at Brooklyn College in the same year. From Columbia University, he earned his master's degree in 1929 and his doctorate in history in 1939. He was a full professor of mathematics at Brooklyn College from 1952 until his death.

== Career ==
Along with Carolyn Eisele of CUNY's Hunter College; C. Doris Hellman of the Pratt Institute, and later City University of New York's Queens College; and Lynn Thorndike of Columbia University, Boyer was instrumental in the 1953 founding of the Metropolitan New York Section of the History of Science Society.

In 1954, Boyer was the recipient of a Guggenheim Fellowship to further his work in the history of science, in particular, the history of the study of rainbows.

Boyer wrote the books The History of the Calculus and Its Conceptual Development (1959), which was originally published as The Concepts of the Calculus (1939). Richard Courant wrote the foreword to the second edition (1949). This was his first book. In it, Boyer examined the history of calculus from the time of the ancient Greeks to the nineteenth century, when calculus was put in a rigorous foundation thanks to the contributions of Augustin-Louis Cauchy, Karl Weierstrass, and others.

Boyer then accomplished a similar feat with History of Analytic Geometry (1956), presenting the developments from antiquity in Mesopotamia and Egypt, to the independent creation of the subject proper by Pierre de Fermat and René Descartes, and to the third quarter of the nineteenth century with the contributions of August Ferdinand Möbius, Julius Plücker, and Arthur Cayley. Boyer gave 76 key primary sources in roughly chronological order at the end of the book. He followed this with The Rainbow: From Myth to Mathematics (1959).

Boyer published A History of Mathematics in 1968. This book broke new ground by discussing mathematics developed during the early twentieth century. After he died in 1976, Uta Merzbach, a historian of mathematics at the Smithsonian Institution, took responsibility for revising and updating the text. The second edition appeared in 1991, with a foreword by Isaac Asimov. She released the third edition in 2011. Since its first edition, it has become a standard text on the subject. Reviewers praised this book for its broad and accessible coverage of interesting developments from antiquity to the modern era. However, the third edition contains no exercises at the end of each chapter. Jason Graham noted that readers interested in more technical details could supplement the book with A History of Mathematics (2009) by Victor Katz or The Fontana History of the Mathematical Sciences (1997) by Ivor Grattan-Guinness.

In 1965, Boyer was appointed associate editor of the Dictionary of Scientific Biography, which was being planned by the American Council of Learned Societies. He also contributed several articles to the Encyclopedia Britannica and served as book-review editor of Scripta Mathematica, published by Yeshiva University.

== Personal life and death ==
He was married to Marjorie Boyer (née Nice), a professor of history. Boyer died of a heart attack at his home Brooklyn, New York, on April 26, 1976. He was 69 years old.

== Legacy ==
In 1978, Boyer's widow established the Carl B. Boyer Memorial Prize, to be awarded annually to an undergraduate at Columbia University who was not an American citizen for the best essay on a scientific or mathematical topic.

According to Morris Kline, Boyer played an instrumental role in establishing the history of mathematics as a worthwhile branch of study at a time when it was largely ignored in mainstream academic circles.
