= Abu Bakr al-Hassar =

12th-century Muslim scholar and mathematician of Morocco

Al-Hassar or Abu Bakr Muhammad ibn Abdallah ibn Ayyash al-Hassar (Arabic: أبو بكر محمد ابن عياش الحصَار) was a 12th-century Moroccan mathematician. He is the author of two books Kitab al-bayan wat-tadhkar (Book of Demonstration and Memorization), a manual of calculation and Kitab al-kamil fi sinaat al-adad (Complete Book on the Art of Numbers), on the breakdown of numbers. The first book is lost and only a part of the second book remains.

Al-Hassar developed the modern symbolic mathematical notation for fractions, where the numerator and denominator are separated by a horizontal bar. This same fractional notation appeared soon after in the work of Fibonacci in the 13th century.
