= Reduction (mathematics) =

Rewriting of an expression into a simpler form

In mathematics, reduction refers to the rewriting of an expression into a simpler form. For example, the process of rewriting a fraction into one with the smallest whole-number denominator possible (while keeping the numerator a whole number) is called "reducing a fraction". Rewriting a radical (or "root") expression with the smallest possible whole number under the radical symbol is called "reducing a radical". Minimizing the number of radicals that appear underneath other radicals in an expression is called denesting radicals.

== Algebra ==
In linear algebra, reduction refers to applying simple rules to a series of equations or matrices to change them into a simpler form. In the case of matrices, the process involves manipulating either the rows or the columns of the matrix and so is usually referred to as row-reduction or column-reduction, respectively. Often the aim of reduction is to transform a matrix into its "row-reduced echelon form" or "row-echelon form"; this is the goal of Gaussian elimination.

== Calculus ==
In calculus, reduction refers to using the technique of integration by parts to evaluate integrals by reducing them to simpler forms.

== Static (Guyan) reduction ==
In dynamic analysis, static reduction refers to reducing the number of degrees of freedom. Static reduction can also be used in finite element analysis to refer to simplification of a linear algebraic problem. Since a static reduction requires several inversion steps it is an expensive matrix operation and is prone to some error in the solution. Consider the following system of linear equations in an FEA problem:

$$\begin{bmatrix}
K_{11} & K_{12} \\
K_{21} & K_{22}
\end{bmatrix}
\begin{bmatrix} x_1 \\ x_2 \end{bmatrix}
=
\begin{bmatrix} F_1 \\ F_2 \end{bmatrix}$$

where K and F are known and K, x and F are divided into submatrices as shown above. If F_{2} contains only zeros, and only x_{1} is desired, K can be reduced to yield the following system of equations

$$\begin{bmatrix}
K_{11,\text{reduced}}
\end{bmatrix}\begin{bmatrix}
x_1
\end{bmatrix} = \begin{bmatrix}
F_1
\end{bmatrix}$$

$K_{11,\text{reduced}}$ is obtained by writing out the set of equations as follows:

$K_{11}x_1 + K_{12}x_2 = F_1$	1

$K_{21}x_1 + K_{22}x_2 = 0$	2

Equation (2) can be solved for $x_2$ (assuming invertibility of $K_{22}$):

$$-K_{22}^{-1} K_{21} x_1 = x_2.$$

And substituting into (1) gives

$$K_{11}x_1 - K_{12} K_{22}^{-1} K_{21} x_1 = F_1.$$

Thus

$$K_{11,\text{reduced}} = K_{11} - K_{12} K_{22}^{-1} K_{21}.$$

In a similar fashion, any row or column i of F with a zero value may be eliminated if the corresponding value of x_{i} is not desired. A reduced K may be reduced again. As a note, since each reduction requires an inversion, and each inversion is an operation with computational cost O(n^{3}), most large matrices are pre-processed to reduce calculation time.

== History ==
In the 9th century, Persian mathematician Al-Khwarizmi's Al-Jabr introduced the fundamental concepts of "reduction" and "balancing", referring to the transposition of subtracted terms to the other side of an equation and the cancellation of like terms on opposite sides of the equation. This is the operation which Al-Khwarizmi originally described as al-jabr. The name "algebra" comes from the "al-jabr" in the title of his book.
