= Victor J. Katz =

American mathematician and historian (1942–present)

Victor Joseph Katz
- Born: December 31, 1942 (age 83); Philadelphia, Pennsylvania, U.S.
- Occupations: Mathematician; Historian of mathematics
- Known for: Using the history of mathematics to teach the subject

Academic background
- Education: Princeton University

Academic work
- Notable works: History of Mathematics: An Introduction (1993)

Victor Joseph Katz (born December 31, 1942, Philadelphia) is an American mathematician, historian of mathematics specialising in islamic Mathematics, and teacher known for using the history of mathematics in teaching mathematics.

== Biography ==
Katz received his bachelor's degree from Princeton University in 1963, and a Ph.D. in mathematics from Brandeis University in 1968 under Maurice Auslander with thesis The Brauer group of a regular local ring. He became an assistant professor at Federal City College and then in 1973 an associate professor and, after the merger of Federal City College into the University of the District of Columbia in 1977, a full professor there in 1980. He retired there as professor emeritus in 2005.

As a mathematician Katz specializes in algebra, but he is mainly known for his work on the history of mathematics and its uses in teaching. He wrote a textbook History of Mathematics: An Introduction (1993), for which he won in 1995 the Watson Davis and Helen Miles Davis Prize. He organized workshops and congresses for the Mathematical Association of America (MAA) and the National Council of Teachers of Mathematics. The MAA published a collection of teaching materials by Katz as a compact disk with the title Historical Modules for the Teaching and Learning of Mathematics. With Frank Swetz, he was a founding editor of a free online journal on the history of mathematics under the aegis of the MAA; the journal is called Convergence: Where Mathematics, History, and Teaching Interact. In the journal Convergence, Katz and Swetz published a series Mathematical Treasures. For a study of the possibilities for using mathematical history in schools, Katz received a grant from the National Science Foundation.

== Selected publications ==
=== As author ===
- History of Mathematics: An Introduction, New York: Harper Collins, 1993, 3rd edition Pearson 2008 (a shortened edition was published in 2003 by Pearson)
- with Karen Hunger Parshall: Taming the Unknown: A History of Algebra from Antiquity to the Early Twentieth Century, Princeton University Press 2014
- with John B. Fraleigh: A first course in abstract algebra, Addison-Wesley 2003

=== As editor ===
- The Mathematics of Egypt, Mesopotamia, China, India and Islam: A Sourcebook, Princeton University Press 2007
- with Bengt Johansson, Frank Swetz, Otto Bekken, John Fauvel: Learn from the Masters, MAA 1994 (contribution by Katz: Historical ideas in teaching linear algebra, Napier's logarithms adapted for today's classroom)
- Using History to Teach Mathematics: An International Perspective, MAA 2000, MAA Notes (No. 51)
- with Marlow Anderson, Robin Wilson: Sherlock Holmes in Babylon and other Tales of Mathematical History, (collection of reprints from the journal Mathematics Magazine of MAA; contribution by Katz: Ideas of calculus in Islam and India), MAA 2004
- with Marlow Anderson, Robin Wilson: Who gave you the epsilon? and other tales of mathematical history, MAA 2009 (continuation of the collection of essays on the history of mathematics from MAA journal; contribution by Katz: The history of Stokes' theorem)
- with Constantinos Tzanakis: Recent Developments on Introducing a Historical Dimension in Mathematics Education, MAA 2011
