= Ibn Turk =

Muslim mathematician (790–854)

ʿAbd al-Hamīd ibn Turk (fl. 830), known also as ʿAbd al-Hamīd ibn Wase ibn Turk al-Jili (Arabic: ابومحمد عبدالحمید بن واسع بن ترک الجیلی) was a ninth-century Islamic mathematician. Not much is known about his life. The two records of him, one by Ibn al-Nadim and the other by Al-Qifti, are not identical. Al-Qifi mentions his name as ʿAbd al-Hamīd ibn Wase ibn Turk al-Jili. Jili means from Gilan. On the other hand, Ibn Nadim mentions his nisbah as khuttali (ختلی), which is a region located north of the Oxus and west of Badakhshan. In one of the two remaining manuscripts of his al-jabr wa al-muqabila, the recording of his nisbah is closer to al-Jili. David Pingree / Encyclopaedia Iranica states that he originally hailed from Khuttal or Gilan. He wrote a work on algebra entitled Logical Necessities in Mixed Equations, which is very similar to Al-Khwarzimi's Al-Jabr and was published at around the same time as, or even possibly earlier than, Al-Jabr. Only a chapter called "Logical Necessities in Mixed Equations", on the solution of quadratic equations, has survived. The manuscript gives exactly the same geometric demonstration as is found in Al-Jabr, and in one case the same example as found in Al-Jabr, and even goes beyond Al-Jabr by giving a geometric proof that if the discriminant is negative, then the quadratic equation has no solution. The similarity between these two works has led some historians to conclude that algebra may have been well developed by the time of Al-Khwarizmi and 'Abd al-Hamid.
