= Sharaf al-Din al-Tusi =

Iranian mathematician and astronomer

Sharaf al-Dīn al-Ṭūsī
- Born: Sharaf al-Dīn al-Muẓaffar ibn Muḥammad ibn al-Muẓaffar al-Ṭūsī c. 1135; Tus, present-day Iran
- Died: c. 1213
- Occupation: Mathematician
- Era: Islamic Golden Age

Sharaf al-Dīn al-Muẓaffar ibn Muḥammad ibn al-Muẓaffar al-Ṭūsī (Persian: شرف‌الدین مظفر بن محمد بن مظفر توسی; c. 1135 – c. 1213) usually shortened to Sharaf al-Dīn al-Ṭūsī, was a Persian mathematician and astronomer of the Islamic Golden Age.

== Biography ==
Al-Tusi was presumably born in the region of Tus, Iran. Little is known about his life, except what is found in the biographies of other scientists and that most mathematicians today can trace their lineage back to him.

Around 1165, he moved to Damascus and taught mathematics there. He then lived in Aleppo for three years, before moving to Mosul, where he met his most famous disciple Kamal al-Din ibn Yunus (1156-1242). Kamal al-Din would later become the teacher of another famous mathematician from Tus, Nasir al-Din al-Tusi.

According to Ibn Abi Usaibi'a, Sharaf al-Din was "outstanding in geometry and the mathematical sciences, having no equal in his time". (Note: Mentioned in the biography of the Damascene architect and physician Abu al-Fadhl al-Harithi (d. 1202-3).)

== Mathematics ==
Al-Tusi has been credited with proposing the idea of a function, however his approach being not very explicit, algebra's decisive move to the dynamic function was made 5 centuries after him, by German polymath Gottfried Leibniz. Sharaf al-Din used what would later be known as the "Ruffini-Horner method" to numerically approximate the root of a cubic equation. He also developed a novel method for determining the conditions under which certain types of cubic equations would have two, one, or no solutions. To al-Tusi, "solution" meant "positive solution", since the possibility of zero or negative numbers being considered genuine solutions had yet to be recognised at the time. The equations in question can be written, using modern notation, in the form f(x) = c, where f(x) is a cubic polynomial in which the coefficient of the cubic term x^{3} is −1, and c is positive. The Muslim mathematicians of the time divided the potentially solvable cases of these equations into five different types, determined by the signs of the other coefficients of f(x). (Note: The five types were: 1. a x2 − x3 = c; 2. b x − x3 = c; 3. b x − a x2 − x3 = c; 4. −b x + a x2 − x3 = c; 5. b x + a x2 − x3 = c; where a and b are positive numbers. For any other values of the coefficients of x and x2, the equation f(x) = c has no positive solution.) For each of these five types, al-Tusi wrote down an expression m for the point where the function f(x) attained its maximum, and gave a geometric proof that f(x) < f(m) for any positive x different from m. He then concluded that the equation would have two solutions if c < f(m), one solution if c = f(m), or none if f(m) < c .

Al-Tusi gave no indication of how he discovered the expressions m for the maxima of the functions f(x). Some scholars have concluded that al-Tusi obtained his expressions for these maxima by "systematically" taking the derivative of the function f(x), and setting it equal to zero. This conclusion has been challenged, however, by others, who point out that al-Tusi nowhere wrote down an expression for the derivative, and suggest other plausible methods by which he could have discovered his expressions for the maxima.

The quantities D = f(m) − c which can be obtained from al-Tusi's conditions for the numbers of roots of cubic equations by subtracting one side of these conditions from the other is today called the discriminant of the cubic polynomials obtained by subtracting one side of the corresponding cubic equations from the other. Although al-Tusi always writes these conditions in the forms c < f(m), c = f(m), or f(m) < c, rather than the corresponding forms D > 0 , D = 0 , or D < 0 , Roshdi Rashed nevertheless considers that his discovery of these conditions demonstrated an understanding of the importance of the discriminant for investigating the solutions of cubic equations.

Sharaf al-Din analyzed the equation x^{3} + d = b⋅x^{2} in the form x^{2} ⋅ (b - x) = d, stating that the left hand side must at least equal the value of d for the equation to have a solution. He then determined the maximum value of this expression. A value less than d means no positive solution; a value equal to d corresponds to one solution, while a value greater than d corresponds to two solutions. Sharaf al-Din's analysis of this equation was a notable development in Islamic mathematics, but his work was not pursued any further at that time, neither in the Muslim or European world.

Sharaf al-Din al-Tusi's "Treatise on equations" has been described by Roshdi Rashed as inaugurating the beginning of algebraic geometry. This was criticized by Jeffrey Oaks who claims that Al-Tusi did not study curves by means of equations, but rather equations by means of curves (just as al-Khayyam had done before him) and that the study of curves by means of equations originated with Descartes in the seventeenth century.

== Astronomy ==
Sharaf al-Din invented a linear astrolabe, sometimes called the "Staff of Tusi". While it was easier to construct and was known in al-Andalus, it did not gain much popularity.

== Honours ==
The main-belt asteroid 7058 Al-Ṭūsī, discovered by Henry E. Holt at Palomar Observatory in 1990, was named in his honor.
