= Arabesque =

Decorative pattern, characteristic of Muslim art

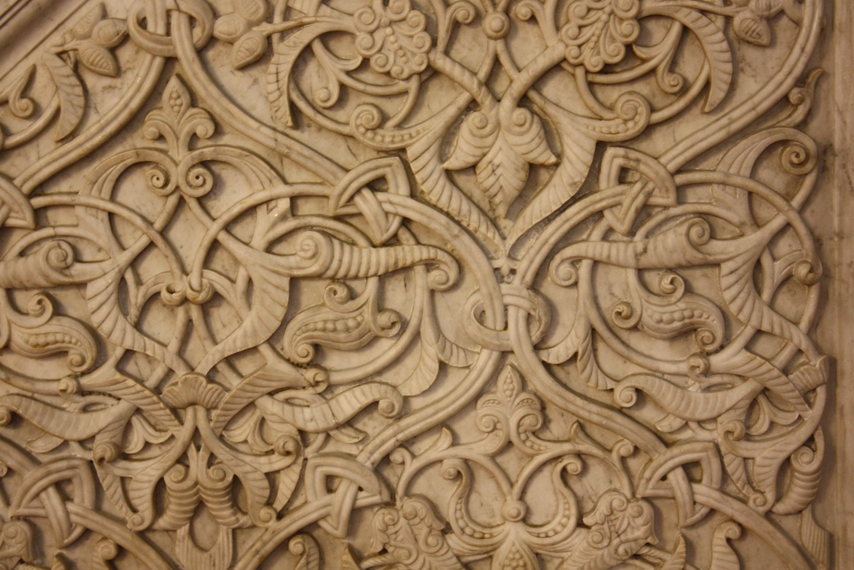
Stone relief with arabesques of tendrils, palmettes and half-palmettes in the Umayyad Mosque, Damascus, Syria

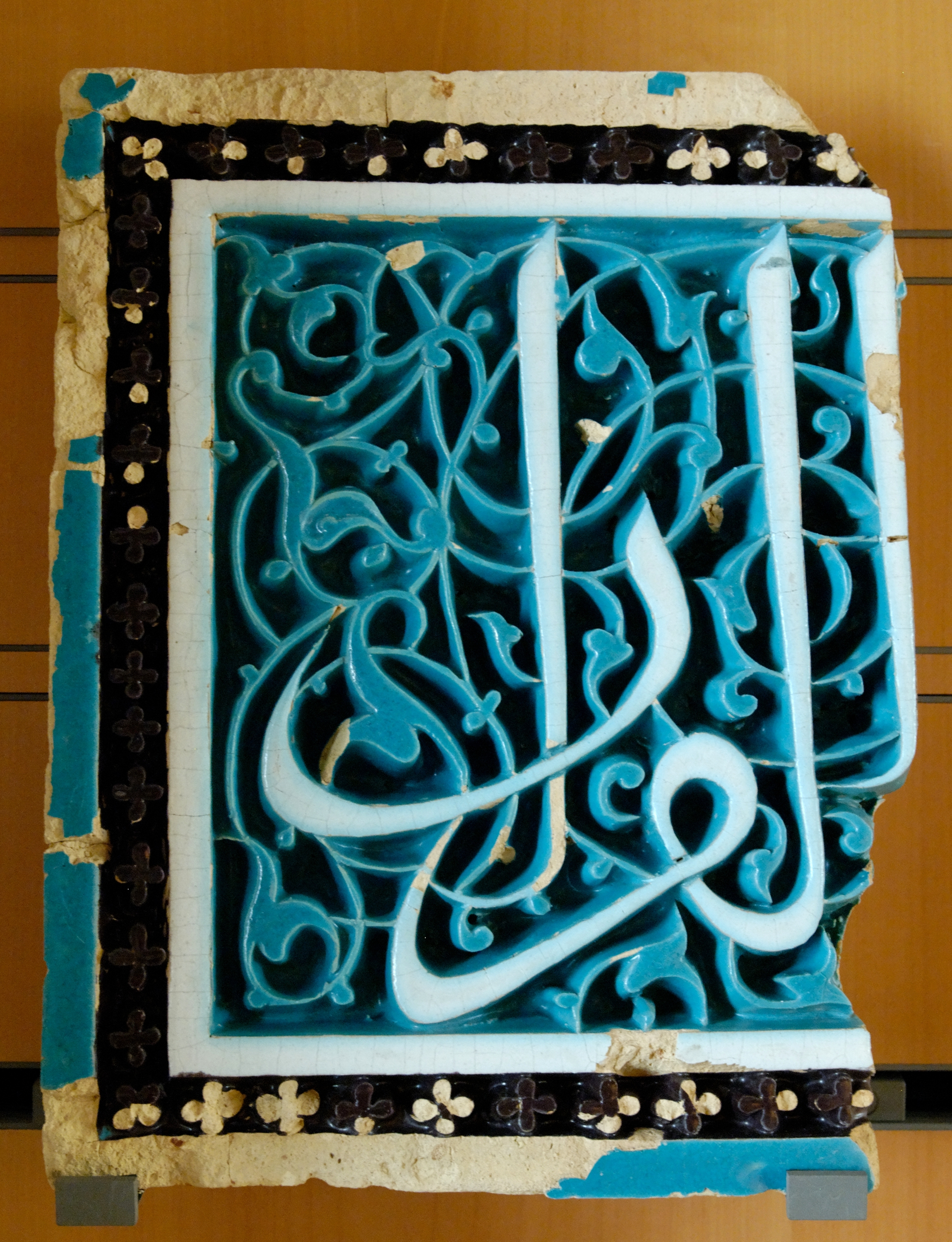
Part of a 15th-century ceramic panel from Samarkand (Uzbekistan) with white calligraphy on a blue arabesque background

The arabesque is a form of artistic decoration consisting of "surface decorations based on rhythmic linear patterns of scrolling and interlacing foliage, tendrils" or plain lines, often combined with other elements. Another definition is "Foliate ornament, used in the Islamic world, typically using leaves, derived from stylised half-palmettes, which were combined with spiralling stems". It usually consists of a single design which can be 'tiled' or seamlessly repeated as many times as desired. Within the very wide range of Eurasian decorative art that includes motifs matching this basic definition, the term "arabesque" is used consistently as a technical term by art historians to describe only elements of the decoration found in two phases: Islamic art from about the 9th century onwards, and European decorative art from the Renaissance onwards. Interlace and scroll decoration are terms used for most other types of similar patterns.

Arabesques are a fundamental element of Islamic art. The past and current usage of the term in respect of European art is confused and inconsistent. Some Western arabesques derive from Islamic art, however others are closely based on ancient Roman decorations. In the West they are essentially found in the decorative arts, but because of the generally non-figurative nature of Islamic art, arabesque decoration is often a very prominent element in the most significant works, and plays a large part in the decoration of architecture.

Claims are often made regarding the theological significance of the arabesque and its origin in a specifically Islamic view of the world; however, these are without support from written historical sources since, like most medieval cultures, the Islamic world has not left us documentation of their intentions in using the decorative motifs they did. At the popular level such theories often appear uninformed as to the wider context of the arabesque. In similar fashion, proposed connections between the arabesque and Arabic knowledge of geometry remains a subject of debate; not all art historians are persuaded that such knowledge had reached, or was needed by, those creating arabesque designs, although in certain cases there is evidence that such a connection did exist. The case for a connection with Islamic mathematics is much stronger for the development of the geometric patterns with which arabesques are often combined in art. Geometric decoration often uses patterns that are made up of straight lines and regular angles that somewhat resemble curvilinear arabesque patterns; the extent to which these too are described as arabesque varies between different writers.

== Islamic arabesque ==
The Islamic arabesque was probably invented in Baghdad around the 10th century. It first appeared as a distinctive and original development in Islamic art in carved marble panels from around this time. What makes Islamic arabesque unique and distinct from vegetal decorations of other cultures is its infinite correspondence and the fact that it can be extended beyond its actual limits. The arabesque developed out of the long-established traditions of plant-based scroll ornament in the cultures taken over by the early Islamic conquests. Early Islamic art, for example in the famous 8th-century mosaics of the Great Mosque of Damascus, often contained plant-scroll patterns, in that case by Byzantine artists in their usual style. The plants most often used are stylized versions of the acanthus, with its emphasis on leafy forms, and the vine, with an equal emphasis on twining stems. The evolution of these forms into a distinctive Islamic type was complete by the 11th century, having begun in the 8th or 9th century in works like the Mshatta Facade. In the process of development the plant forms became increasingly simplified and stylized. The relatively abundant survivals of stucco reliefs from the walls of palaces (but not mosques) in Abbasid Samarra, the Islamic capital between 836 and 892, provide examples of three styles, Styles A, B, and C, though more than one of these may appear on the same wall, and their chronological sequence is not certain.

Though the broad outline of the process is generally agreed, there is a considerable diversity of views held by specialist scholars on detailed issues concerning the development, categorization and meaning of the arabesque. The detailed study of Islamic arabesque forms was begun by Alois Riegl in his formalist study Stilfragen: Grundlegungen zu einer Geschichte der Ornamentik (Problems of style: foundations for a history of ornament) of 1893, who in the process developed his influential concept of the Kunstwollen. Riegl traced formalistic continuity and development in decorative plant forms from ancient Egyptian art and other ancient Near Eastern civilizations through the classical world to the Islamic arabesque. While the Kunstwollen has few followers today, his basic analysis of the development of forms has been confirmed and refined by the wider corpus of examples known today. Jessica Rawson has recently extended the analysis to cover Chinese art, which Riegl did not cover, tracing many elements of Chinese decoration back to the same tradition, the shared background helping make the assimilation of Chinese motifs into Persian art after the Mongol invasion harmonious and productive.

Many arabesque patterns disappear at (or "under", as it often appears to a viewer) a framing edge without ending and thus can be regarded as infinitely extendable outside the space they actually occupy; this was certainly a distinctive feature of the Islamic form, though not without precedent. Most but not all foliage decoration in the preceding cultures terminated at the edge of the occupied space, although infinitely repeatable patterns in foliage are very common in the modern world in wallpaper and textiles.

Typically, in earlier forms there is no attempt at realism; no particular species of plant is being imitated, and the forms are often botanically impossible or implausible. "Leaf" forms typically spring sideways from the stem, in what is often called a "half-palmette" form, named after its distant and very different looking ancestor in ancient Egyptian and Greek ornament. New stems spring from leaf-tips, a type often called honeysuckle, and the stems often have no tips, winding endlessly out of the space. The early Mshatta Facade is recognisably some sort of vine, with conventional leaves on the end of short stalks and bunches of grapes or berries, but later forms usually lack these. Flowers are rare until about 1500, after which they appear more often, especially in Ottoman art, and are often identifiable by species. In Ottoman art the large and feathery leaves called saz became very popular, and were elaborated in drawings showing just one or more large leaves. Eventually floral decoration mostly derived from Chinese styles, especially those of Chinese porcelain, replaces the arabesque in many types of work, such as pottery, textiles and miniatures.

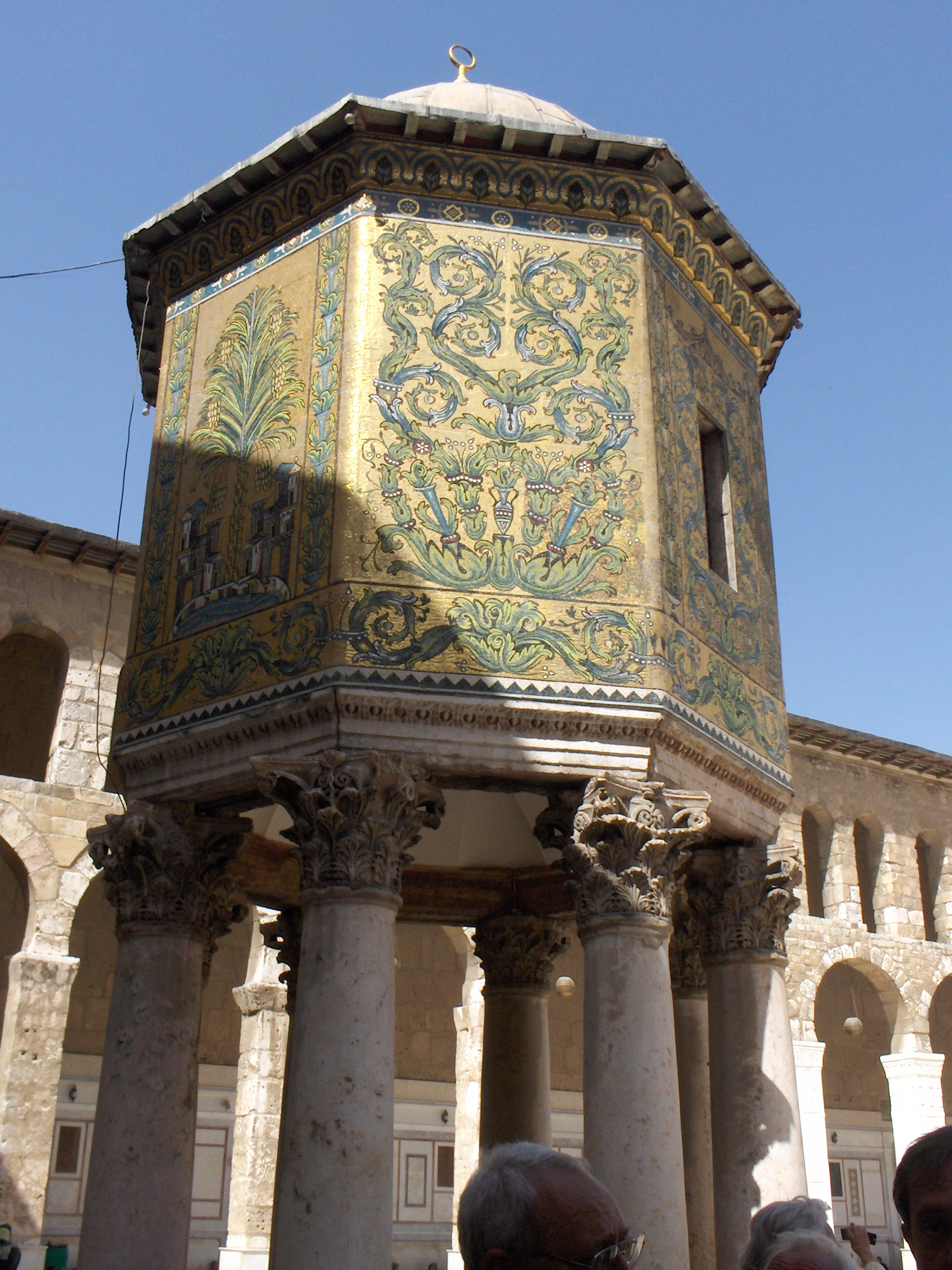
Mosaics on the Treasury Dome of the Great Mosque of Damascus, 789, still in essentially Byzantine style

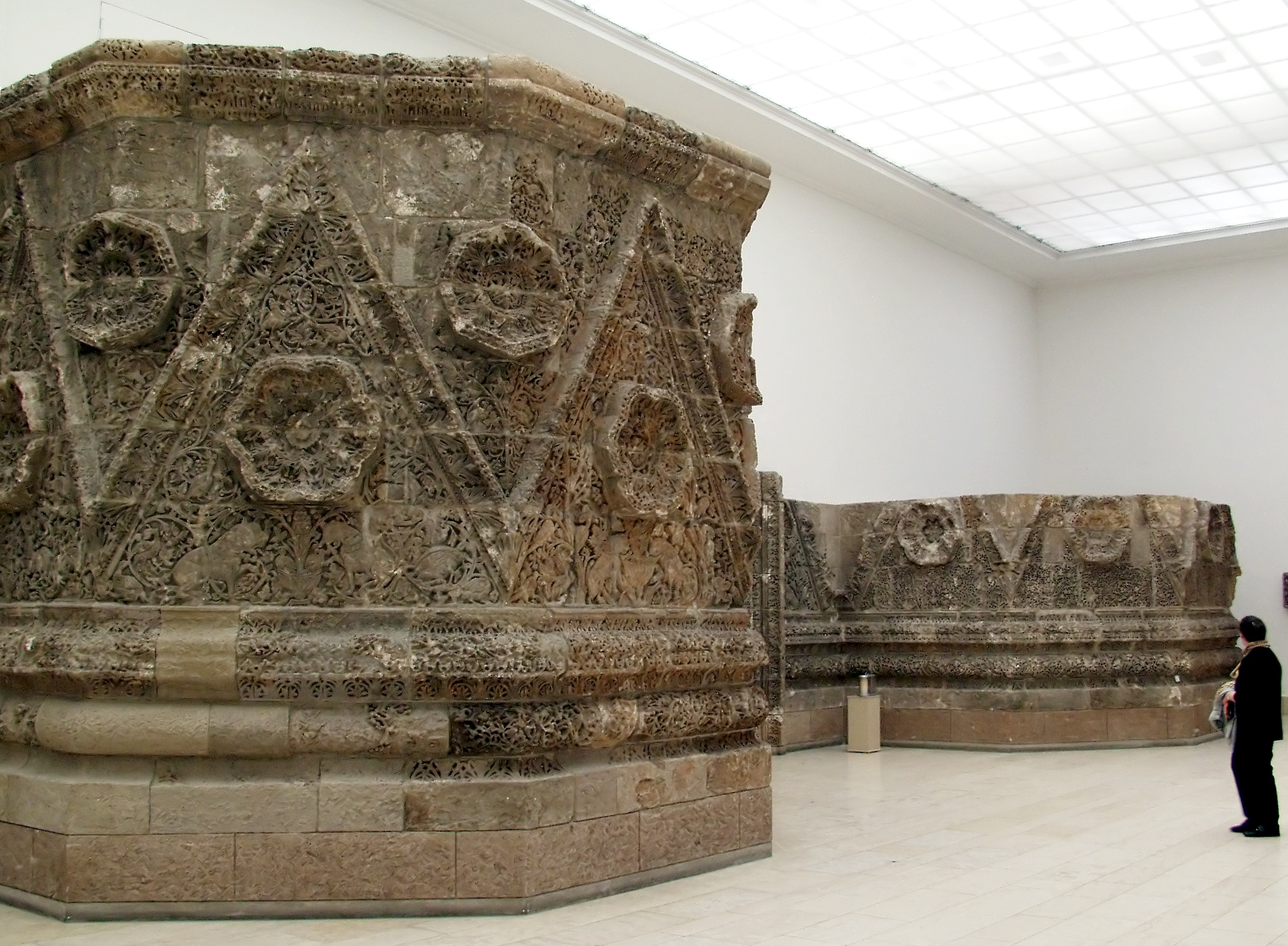
Palace facade from Mshatta in Jordan, c.740, now in the Pergamon Museum (Berlin)

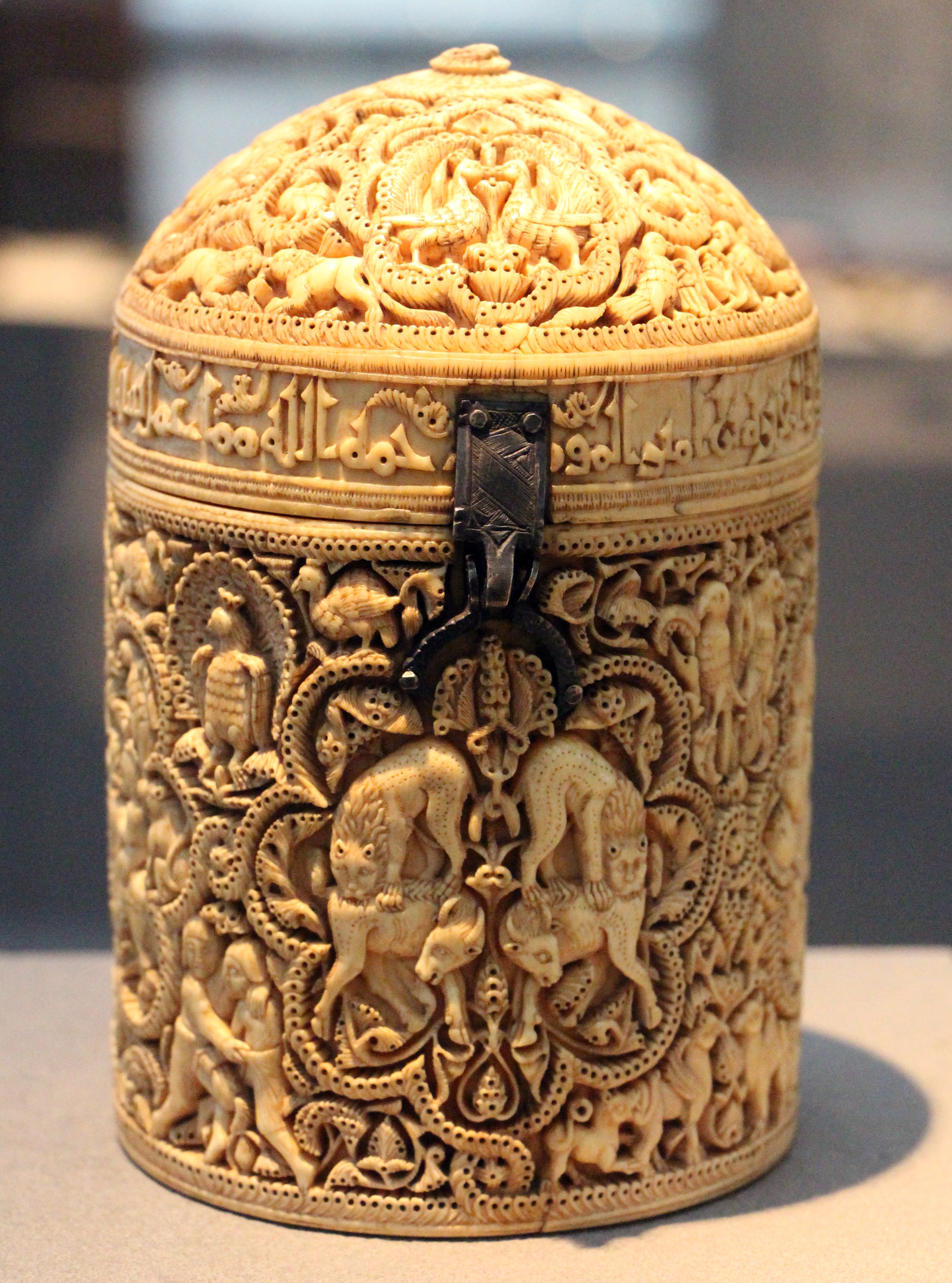
Pyxis of al-Mughira, 10th century, in the Louvre

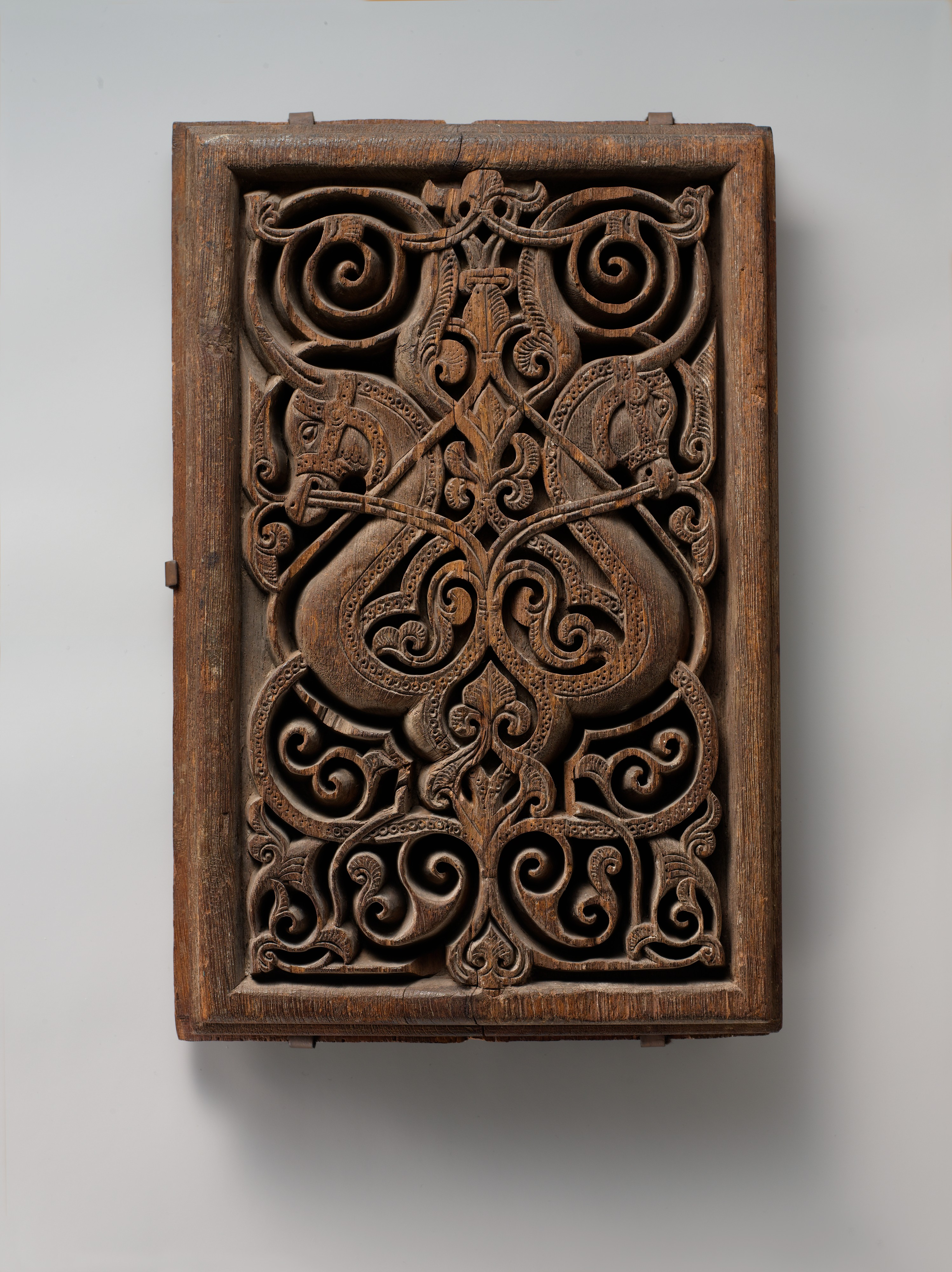
Panel with horse heads, 11th century, in the Metropolitan Museum of Art, New York City

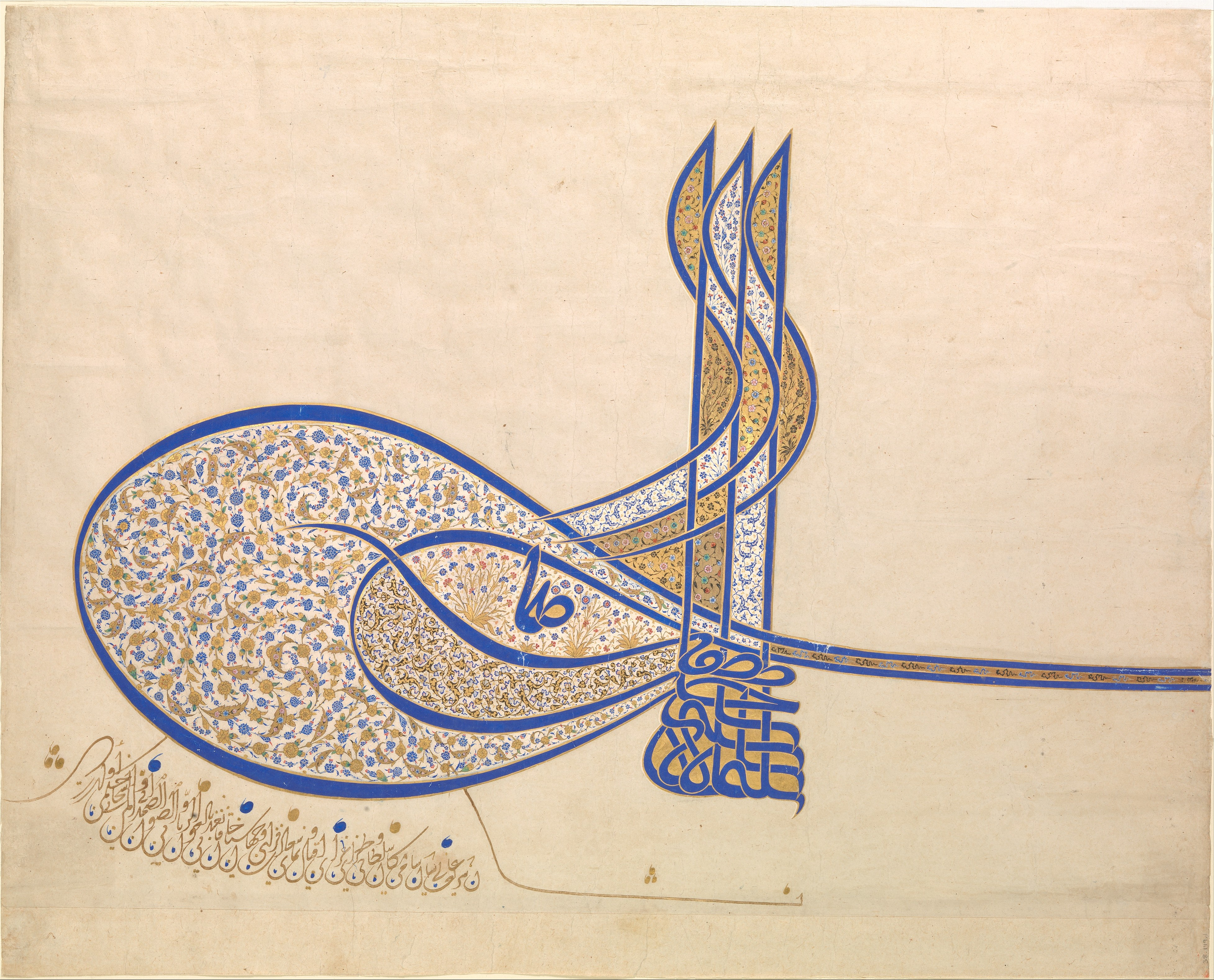
Ottoman tughra of Suleiman the Magnificent, with flowers and saz leaves, 1520

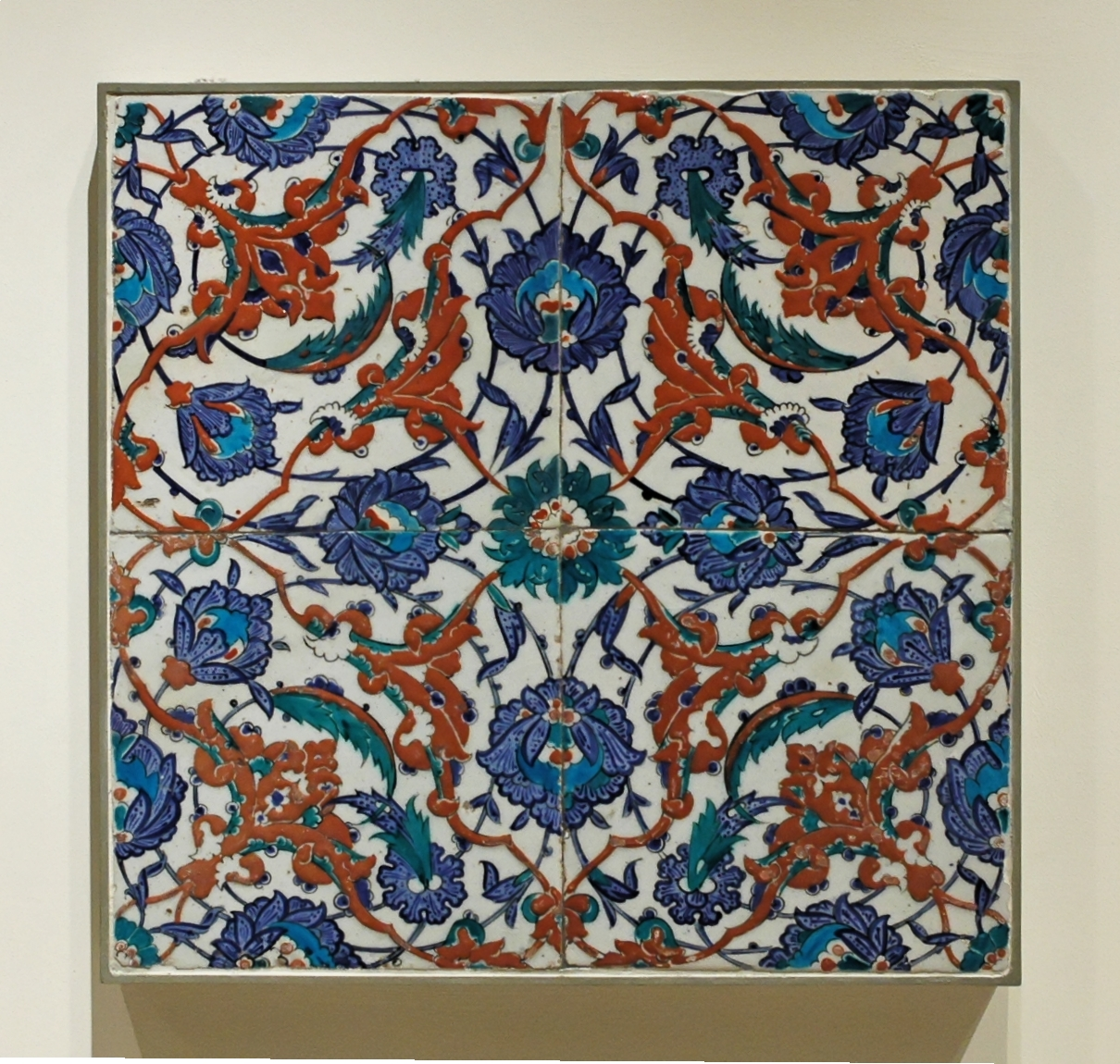
Iznik tile panel with flowers, 1550-1600, in the Louvre

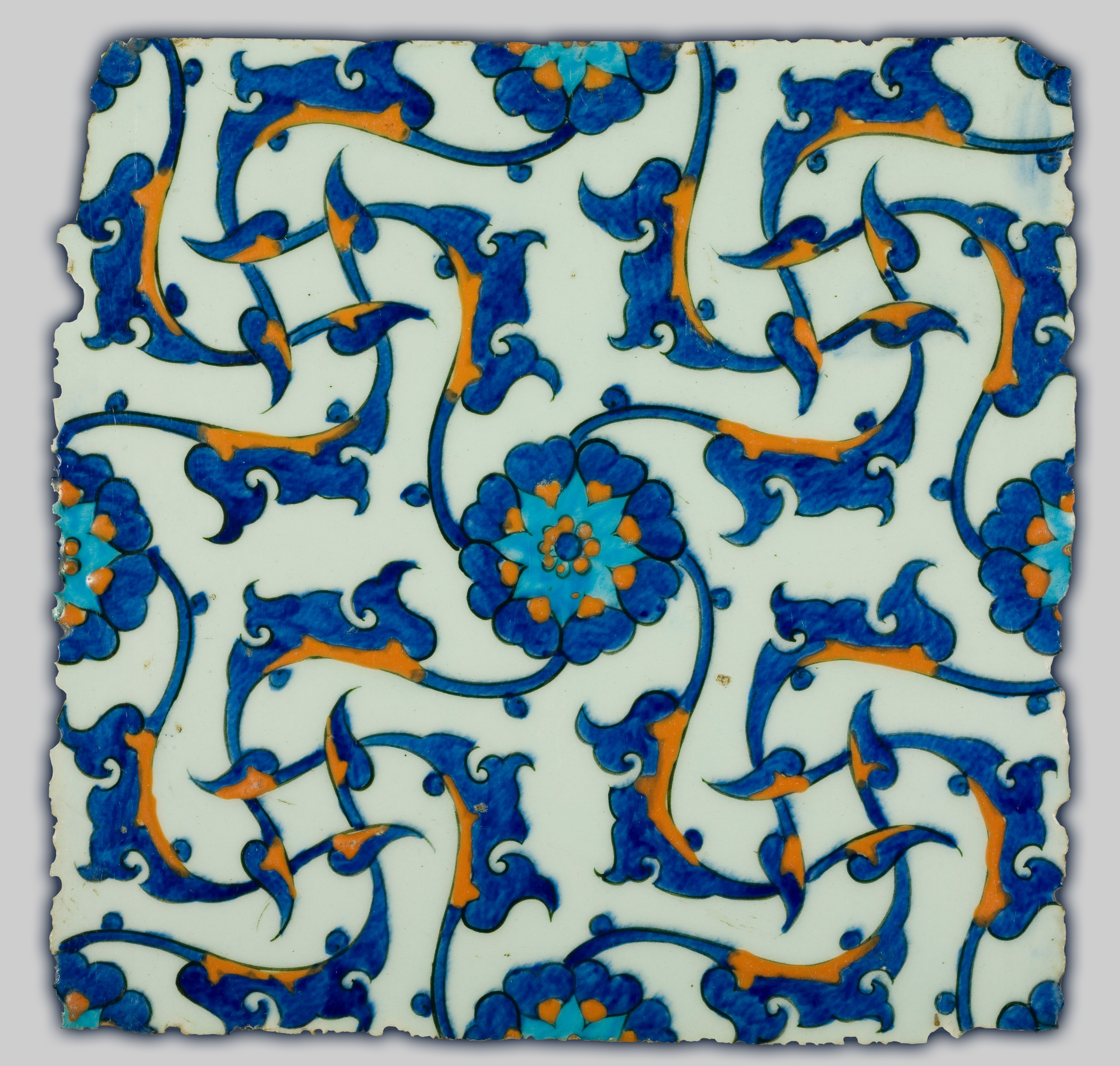
Iznik tile, 1560, in the Museum of Islamic Art from Doha, Qatar

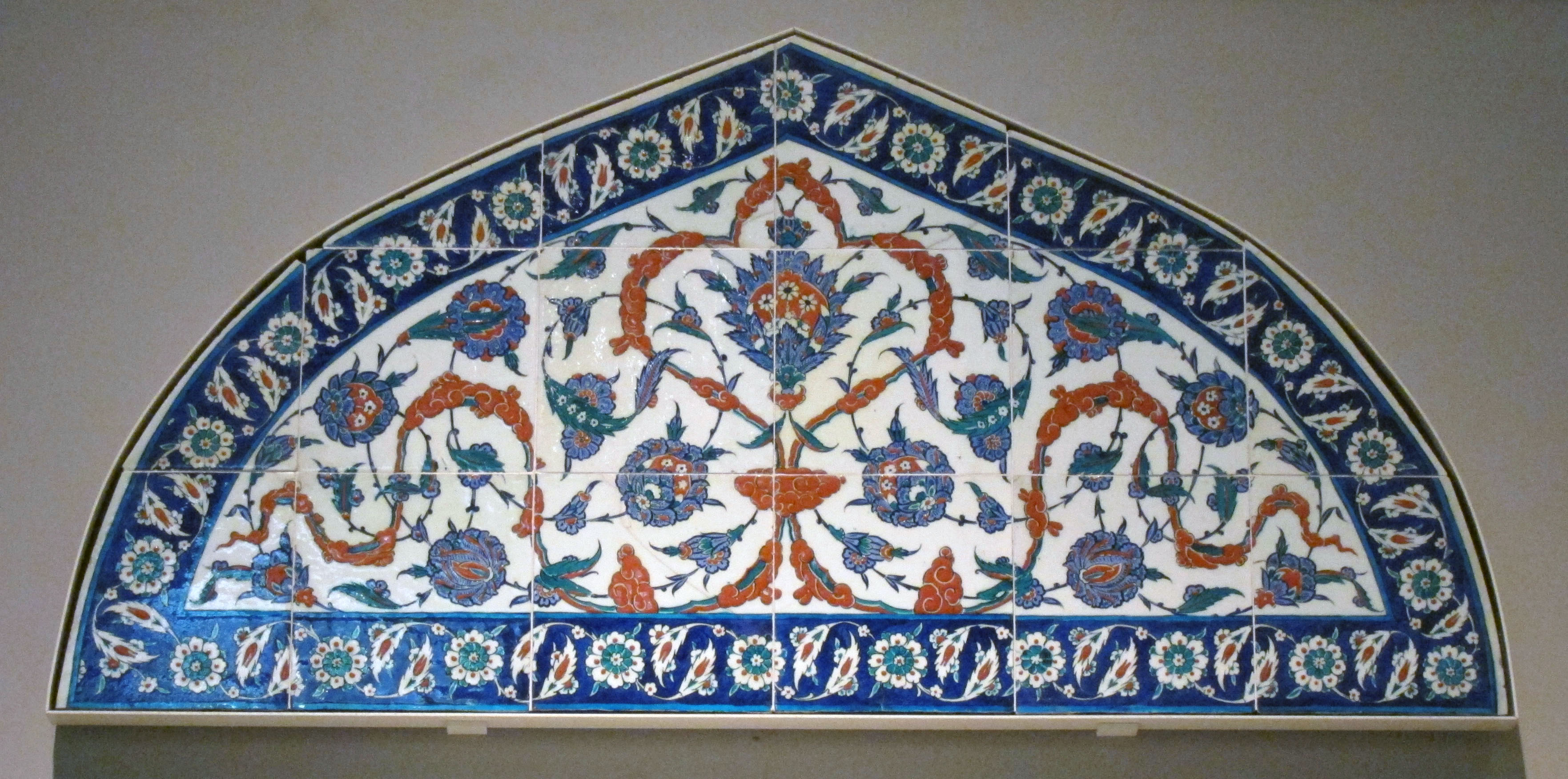
Iznik tiled lunette panel that may have come from the Piyale Pasha Mosque in Istanbul, 1570-1575, in the Victoria and Albert Museum in London

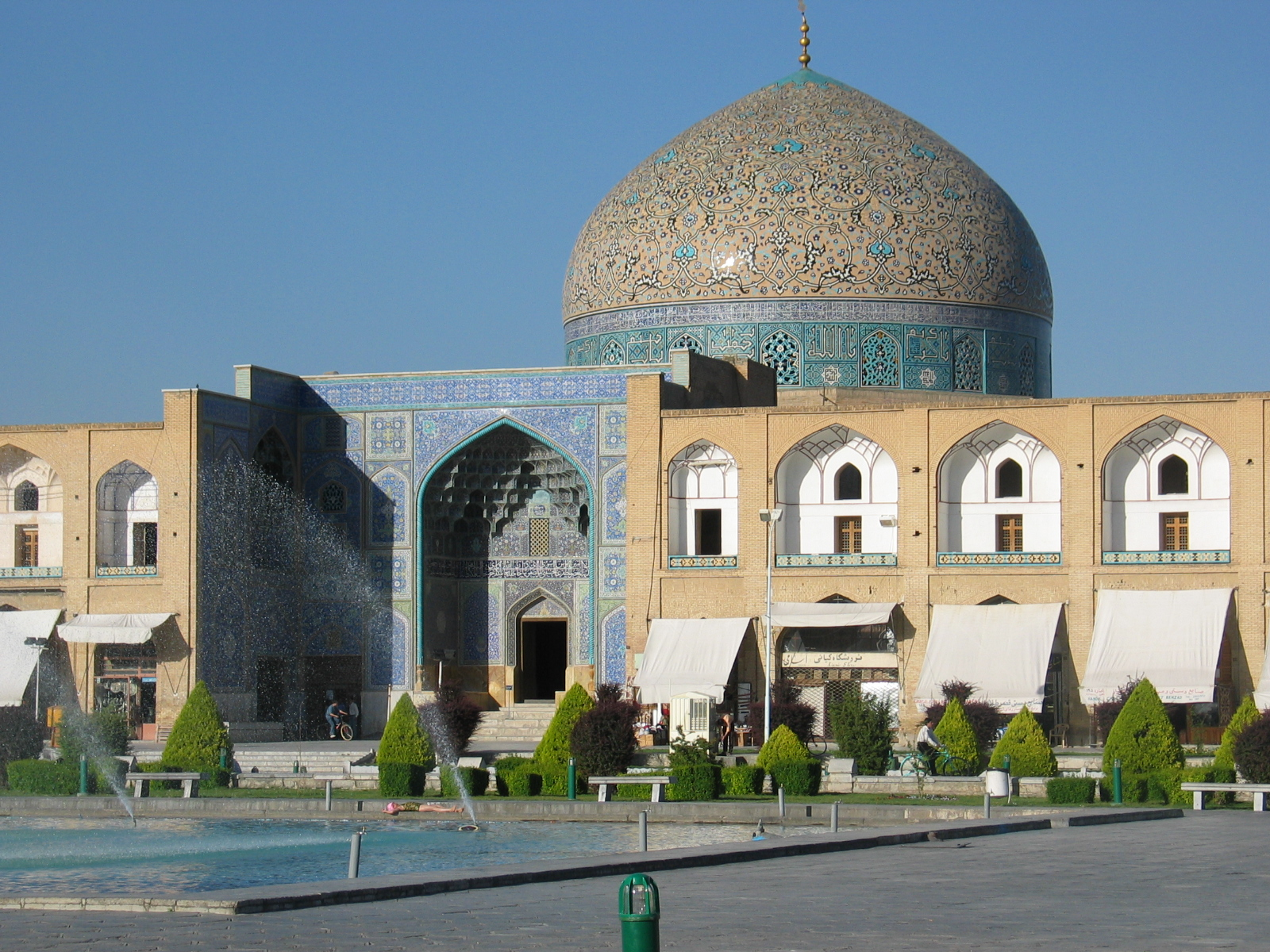
Giant arabesque pattern on the dome of the Sheikh Lotfallah Mosque from Isfahan, Iran, 17th century

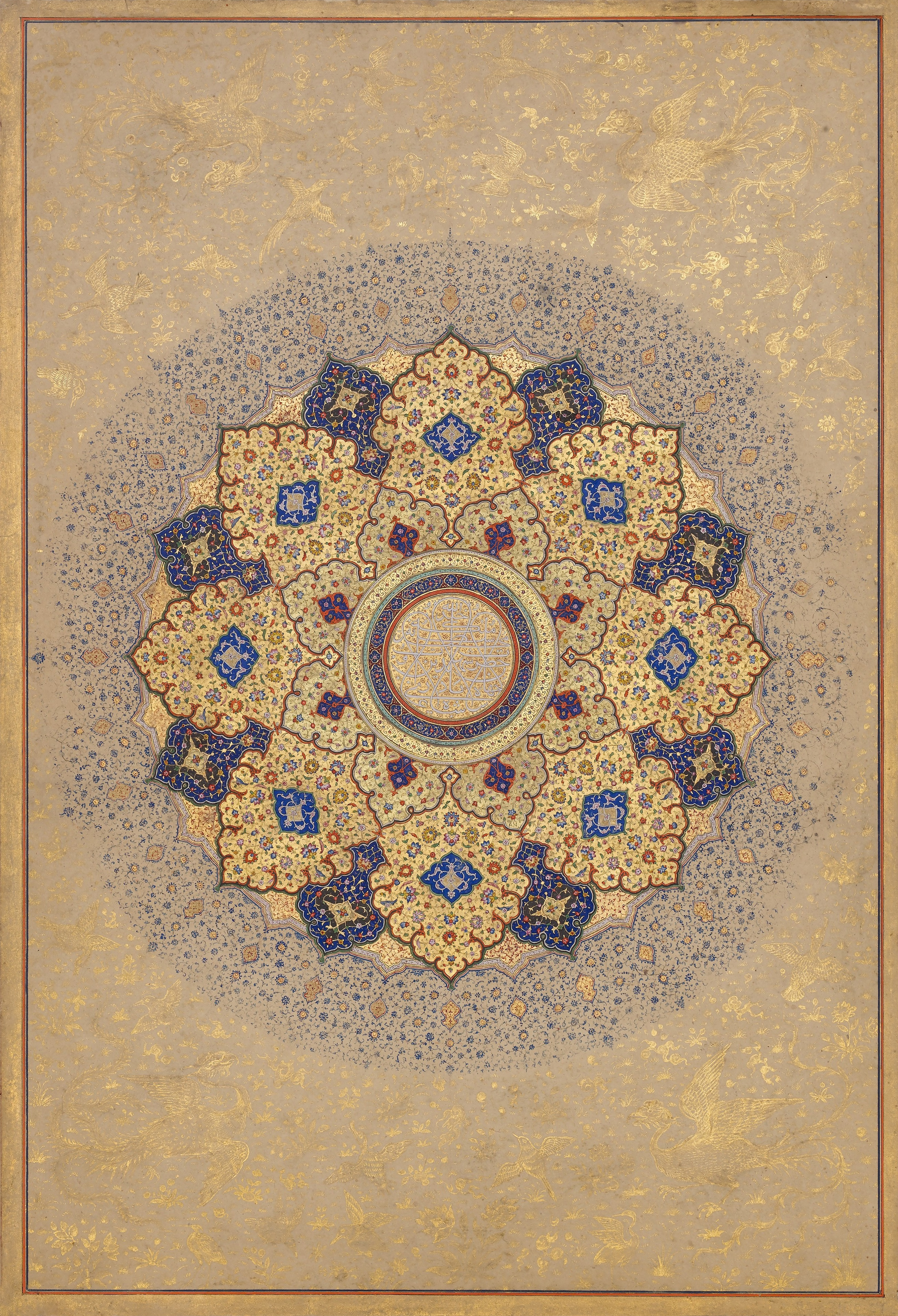
"Rosette bearing the names and titles of shah Jahan", folio from the shah Jahan album, c. 1645, in the Metropolitan Museum of Art

=== Significance in Islam ===
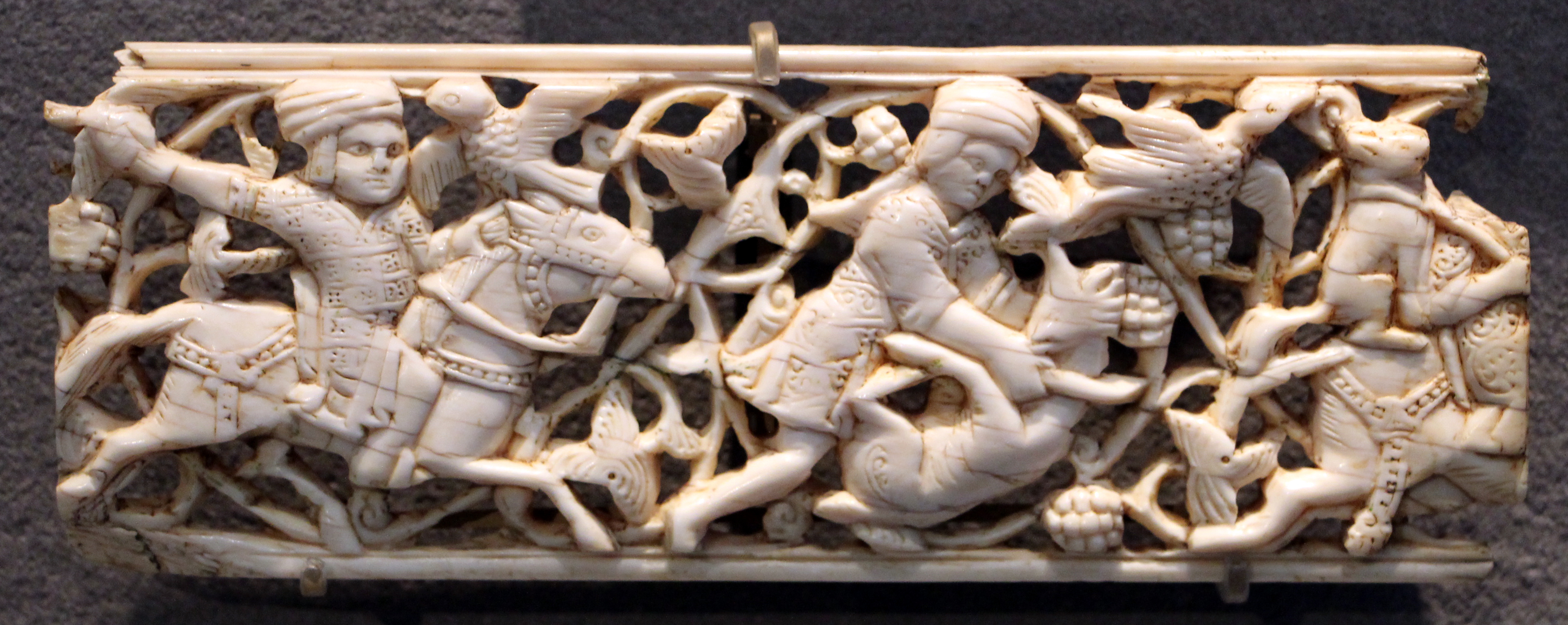
Arabesque pattern behind hunters on ivory plaque, 11th–12th century, Egypt

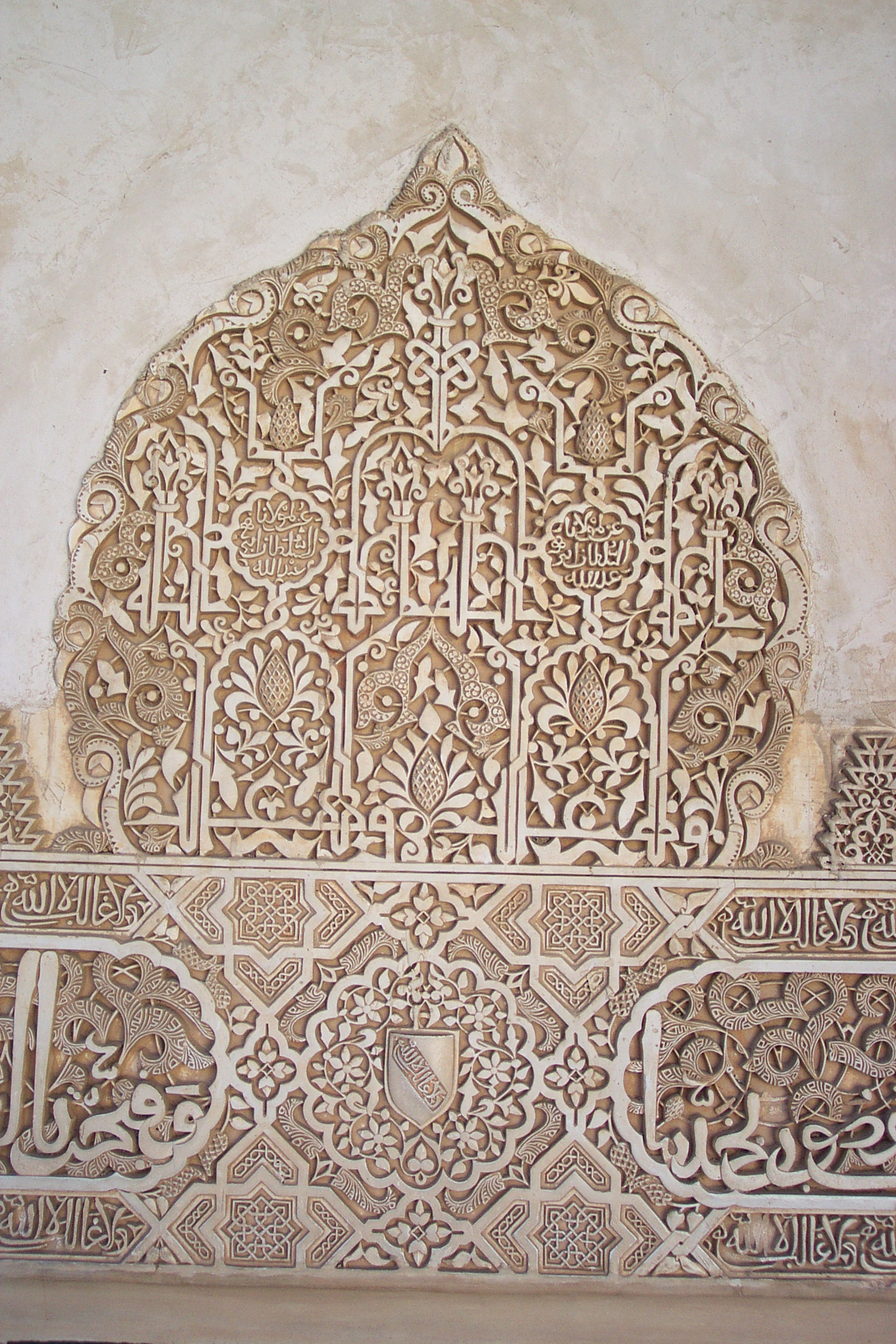
Three modes: arabesques, geometric patterns, and calligraphy used together in the Court of the Myrtles of Alhambra (Granada, Spain)

The arabesques and geometric patterns of Islamic art are often said to arise from the Islamic view of the world (see above). The depiction of animals and people is generally discouraged, which explains the preference for abstract geometric patterns.

There are two modes to arabesque art. The first mode recalls the principles that govern the order of the world. These principles include the bare basics of what makes objects structurally sound and, by extension, beautiful (i.e. the angle and the fixed/static shapes that it creates—esp. the truss). In the first mode, each repeating geometric form has a built-in symbolism ascribed to it. For example, the square, with its four equilateral sides, is symbolic of the equally important elements of nature: earth, air, fire and water. Without any one of the four, the physical world, represented by a circle that inscribes the square, would collapse upon itself and cease to exist. The second mode is based upon the flowing nature of plant forms. This mode recalls the feminine nature of life giving. In addition, upon inspection of the many examples of Arabesque art, some would argue that there is in fact a third mode, the mode of Islamic calligraphy.

Instead of recalling something related to the 'True Reality' (the reality of the spiritual world), Islam considers calligraphy a visible expression of the highest art of all; the art of the spoken word (the transmittal of thoughts and of history). In Islam, the most important document to be transmitted orally is the Qur'an. Proverbs and complete passages from the Qur'an can be seen today in Arabesque art. The coming together of these three forms creates the Arabesque, and this is a reflection of unity arising from diversity; a basic tenet of Islam.

The arabesque may be equally thought of as both art and science. The artwork is at the same time mathematically precise, aesthetically pleasing, and symbolic. Due to this duality of creation, the artistic part of this equation may be further subdivided into both secular and religious artwork. However, for many Muslims there is no distinction; all forms of art, the natural world, mathematics and science are seen to be creations of God and therefore reflections of the same thing: God's will expressed through his creation. In other words, man can discover the geometric forms that constitute the arabesque, but these forms always existed before as part of God's creation, as shown in this picture.

There is great similarity between arabesque artwork from very different geographic regions. In fact, the similarities are so pronounced that it is sometimes difficult for experts to tell where a given style of arabesque comes from. The reason for this is that the science and mathematics that are used to construct Arabesque artwork are universal. Therefore, for most Muslims, the best artwork that can be created by man for use in the Mosque is artwork that displays the underlying order and unity of nature. The order and unity of the material world, they believe, is a mere ghostly approximation of the spiritual world, which for many Muslims is the place where the only true reality exists. Discovered geometric forms, therefore, exemplify this perfect reality because God's creation has been obscured by the sins of man.

Mistakes in repetitions may be intentionally introduced as a show of humility by artists who believe only Allah can produce perfection, although this theory is disputed. Arabesque art consists of a series of repeating geometric forms which are occasionally accompanied by calligraphy. Ettinghausen et al. describe the arabesque as a "vegetal design consisting of full...and half palmettes [as] an unending continuous pattern...in which each leaf grows out of the tip of another." To the adherents of Islam, the Arabesque is symbolic of their united faith and the way in which traditional Islamic cultures view the world.

== Terminology and Western arabesque ==
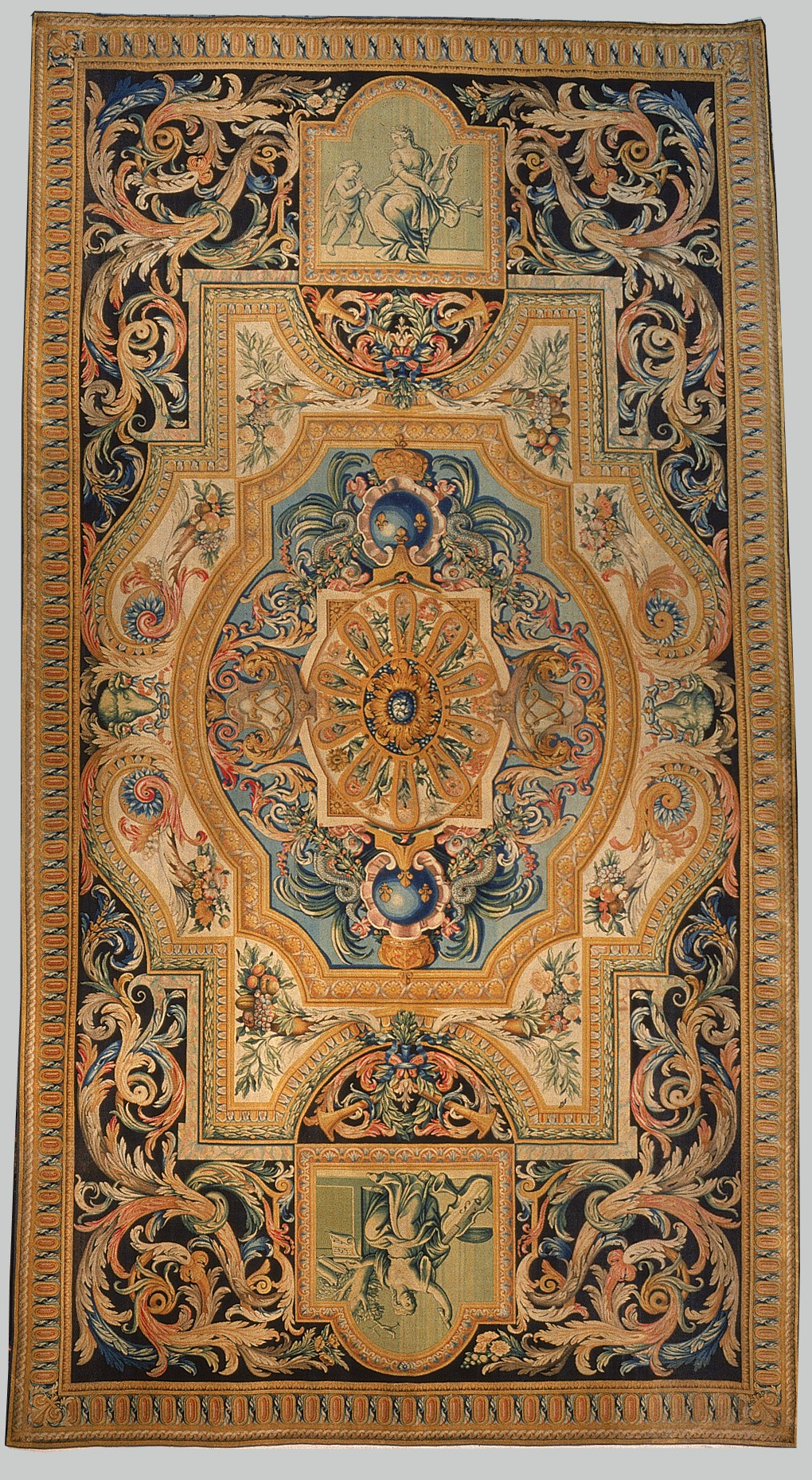
The French sense of arabesque: a Savonnerie carpet in the Louis XIV style, c.1685–1697, wool, Metropolitan Museum of Art, New York City

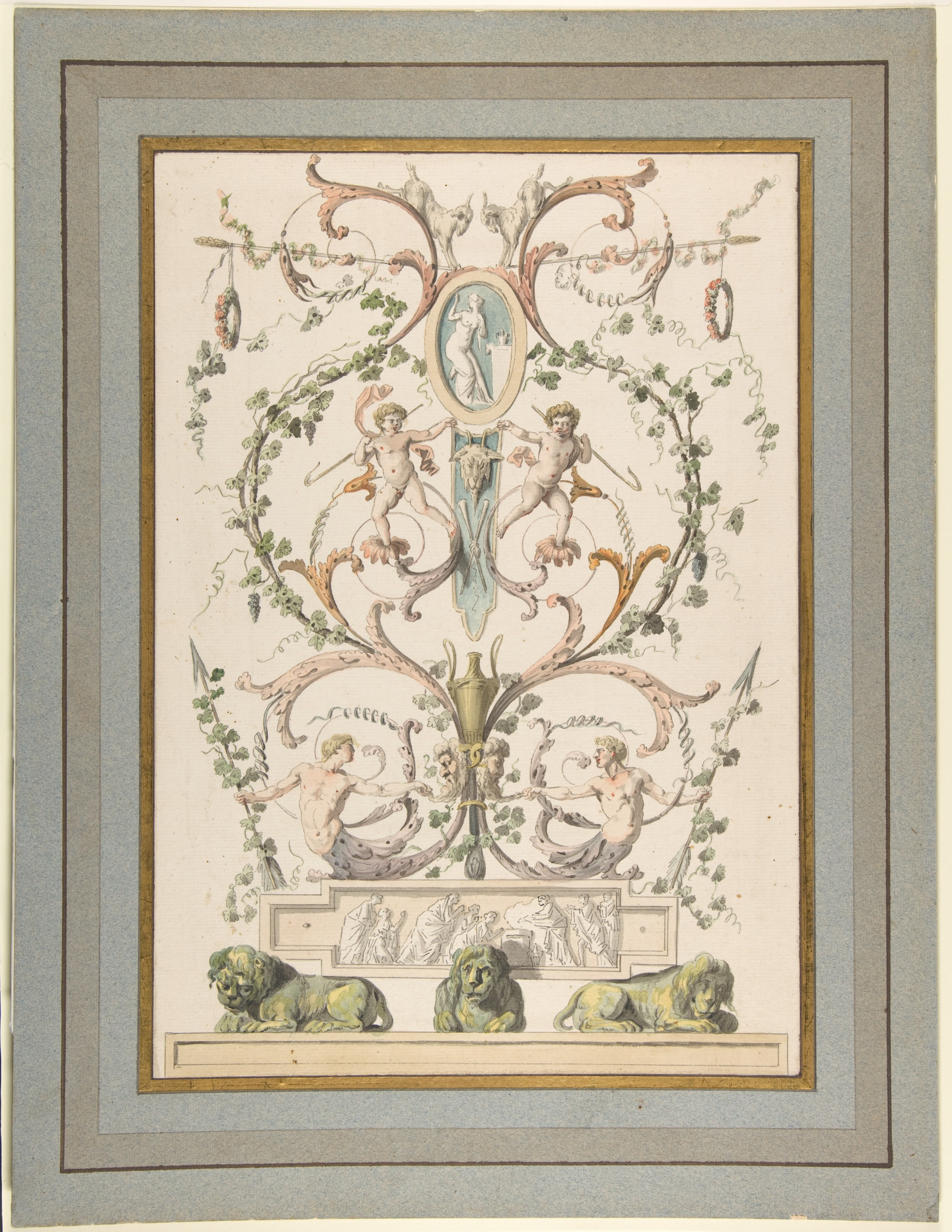
Design of a Louis XVI style arabesque, by Étienne de La Vallée Poussin, c.1780–1793, pen and gray and brown ink, brush and colored wash, Metropolitan Museum of Art

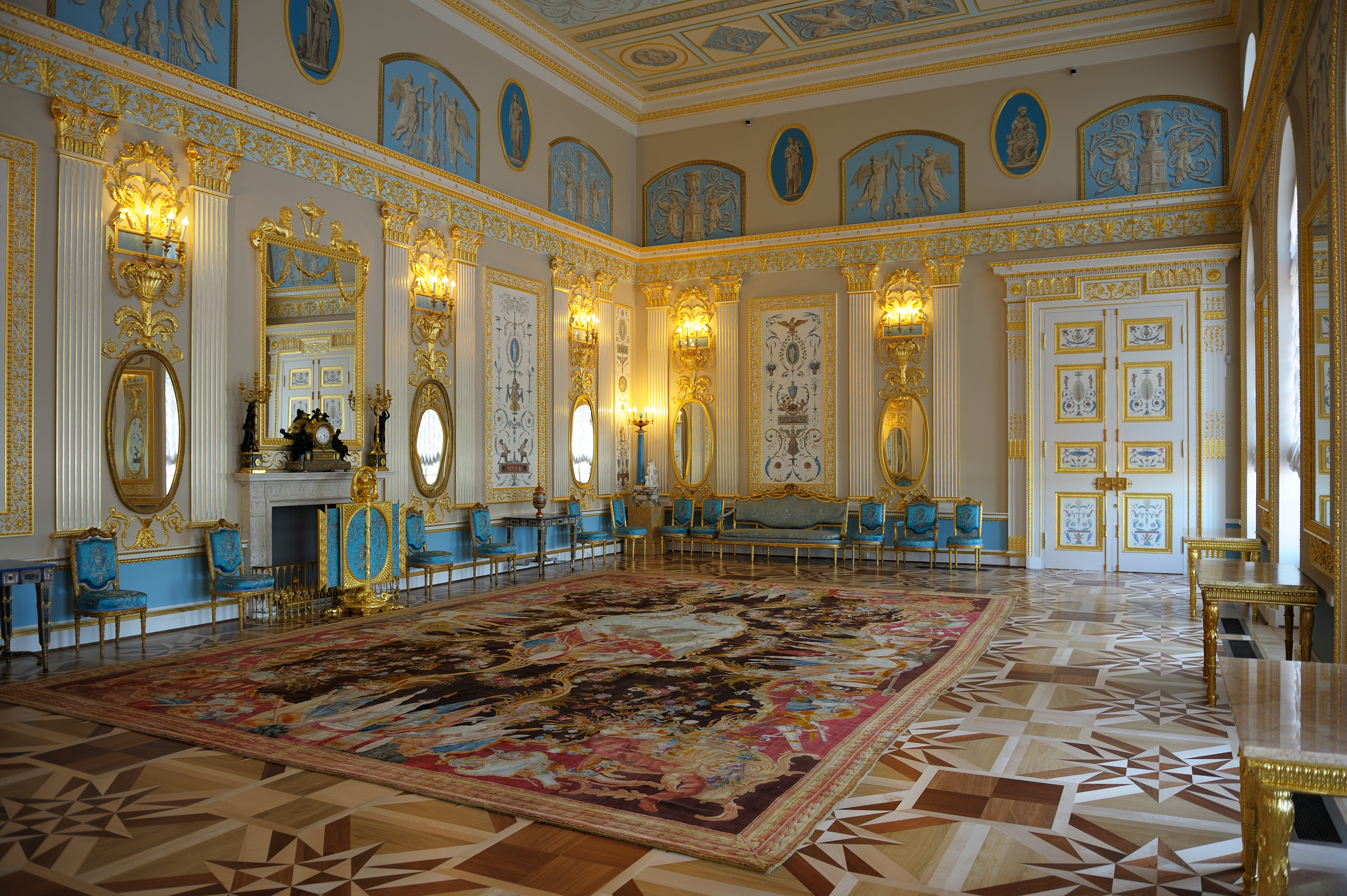
The "Arabesque Room" in the Catherine Palace, with neoclassical grotesque decoration

Arabesque is a French term derived from the Italian word arabesco, meaning "in the Arabic style". The term was first used in Italian, where rabeschi was used in the 16th century as a term for "pilaster ornaments featuring acanthus decoration", specifically "running scrolls" that ran vertically up a panel or pilaster, rather than horizontally along a frieze.

According to Ralph Nicholson Wornum in 1882: "The western arabesque which appeared in the 15th century derived from Roman remains of the early time of the empire, not to any style derived from Arabian or Moorish work. Arabesque and Moresque are really distinct; the latter is from the Arabian style of ornament, developed by the Byzantine Greeks for their new masters, after the conquests of the followers of Mahomet; and the former is a term pretty well restricted to varieties of cinquecento decoration, which have nothing in common with any Arabian examples in their details, but are a development derived from Greek and Roman grotesque designs, such as we find them in the remains of ancient palaces at Rome, and in ancient houses at Pompeii. These were reproduced by Raphael and his pupils in the decoration of some of the corridors of the Loggie of the Vatican at Rome: grotesque is thus a better name for these decorations than Arabesque. This technical Arabesque, therefore, is much more ancient than any Arabian or Moorish decoration, and has really nothing in common with it except the mere symmetrical principles of its arrangement. Pliny and Vitruvius give us no name for the extravagant decorative wall-painting in vogue in their time, to which the early Italian revivers of it seem to have given the designation of grotesque, because it, was first discovered in the arched or underground chambers (grotte) of Roman ruins—as in the golden house of Nero, or the baths of Titus. What really took place in the Italian revival was in some measure a supplanting of the Arabesque for the classical grotesque, still retaining the original Arabian designation, while the genuine Arabian art, the Saracenic, was distinguished as Moresque or Moorish."

The book Opera nuova che insegna a le donne a cuscire … laqual e intitolata Esempio di raccammi (A New Work that Teaches Women how to Sew … Entitled "Samples of Embroidery"), published in Venice in 1530, includes "groppi moreschi e rabeschi", Moorish knots and arabesques.

From there it spread to England, where Henry VIII owned, according to an inventory of 1549, an agate cup with a "fote and Couer of siluer and guilt enbossed with Rebeske worke", and William Herne or Heron, Serjeant Painter from 1572 to 1580, was paid for painting Elizabeth I's barge with "rebeske work". The styles so described can only be guessed at, although the design by Hans Holbein for a covered cup for Jane Seymour in 1536 (see gallery) already has zones in both Islamic-derived arabesque/moresque style (see below) and classically derived acanthus volutes.

Another related term is moresque, meaning "Moorish"; Randle Cotgrave's A Dictionarie of the French and English Tongues of 1611 defines this as: "a rude or anticke painting, or carving, wherin the feet and tayles of beasts, &c, are intermingled with, or made to resemble, a kind of wild leaves, &c." and "arabesque", in its earliest use cited in the OED (but as a French word), as "Rebeske work; a small and curious flourishing". In France "arabesque" first appears in 1546, and "was first applied in the latter part of the 17th century" to grotesque ornament, "despite the classical origin of the latter", especially if without human figures in it—a distinction still often made, but not consistently observed.

Over the following centuries, the three terms "grotesque", "moresque", and "arabesque" were used largely interchangeably in English, French, and German for styles of decoration derived at least as much from the European past as the Islamic world, with "grotesque" gradually acquiring its main modern meaning, related more to Gothic gargoyles and caricature than to either Pompeii-style Roman painting or Islamic patterns. Meanwhile, the word "arabesque" was now being applied to Islamic art itself, by 1851 at the latest, when John Ruskin uses it in The Stones of Venice. Writers over the last decades have attempted to salvage meaningful distinctions between the words from the confused wreckage of historical sources.

Peter Fuhring, a specialist in the history of ornament, says that (also in a French context):

The ornament known as moresque in the fifteenth and sixteenth centuries (but now more commonly called arabesque) is characterized by bifurcated scrolls composed of branches forming interlaced foliage patterns. These basic motifs gave rise to numerous variants, for example, where the branches, generally of a linear character, were turned into straps or bands. ... It is characteristic of the moresque, which is essentially a surface ornament, that it is impossible to locate the pattern's beginning or end. ... Originating in the Middle East, they were introduced to continental Europe via Italy and Spain ... Italian examples of this ornament, which was often used for bookbindings and embroidery, are known from as early as the late fifteenth century.

Fuhring notes that grotesques were "confusingly called arabesques in eighteenth century France", but in his terminology "the major types of ornament that appear in French sixteenth century etchings and engraving ... can be divided into two groups. The first includes ornaments adopted from antiquity: grotesques, architectural ornaments such as the orders, foliage scrolls and self-contained elements such as trophies, terms and vases. A second group, far smaller than the first, comprises modern ornaments: moresques, interlaced bands, strapwork, and elements such as cartouches"—categories he goes on to discuss individually.

The moresque or arabesque style was especially popular and long-lived in the Western arts of the book: bookbindings decorated in gold tooling, borders for illustrations, and printer's ornaments for decorating empty spaces on the page. In this field the technique of gold tooling had also arrived in the 15th century from the Islamic world, and indeed much of the leather itself was imported from there. Small motifs in this style have continued to be used by conservative book designers up to the present day.

According to Harold Osborne, in France, the "characteristic development of the French arabesque combined bandwork deriving from the moresque with decorative acanthus foliage radiating from C-scrolls connected by short bars". Apparently starting in embroidery, it then appears in garden design before being used in Northern Mannerist painted decorative schemes "with a central medallion combined with acanthus and other forms" by Simon Vouet and then Charles Lebrun who used "scrolls of flat bandwork joined by horizontal bars and contrasting with ancanthus scrolls and palmette." More exuberant arabesque designs by Jean Bérain the Elder are an early "intimation" of the Rococo, which was to take the arabesque into three dimensions in reliefs.

The use of "arabesque" as an English noun first appears, in relation to painting, in William Beckford's novel Vathek in 1786. Arabesque is also used as a term for complex freehand pen flourishes in drawing or other graphic media. The Grove Dictionary of Art will have none of this confusion, and says flatly: "Over the centuries the word has been applied to a wide variety of winding and twining vegetal decoration in art and meandering themes in music, but it properly applies only to Islamic art", so contradicting the definition of 1888 still found in the Oxford English Dictionary: "A species of mural or surface decoration in colour or low relief, composed in flowing lines of branches, leaves, and scroll-work fancifully intertwined. Also fig[uratively]. As used in Moorish and Arabic decorative art (from which, almost exclusively, it was known in the Middle Ages), representations of living creatures were excluded; but in the arabesques of Raphael, founded on the ancient Græco-Roman work of this kind, and in those of Renaissance decoration, human and animal figures, both natural and grotesque, as well as vases, armour, and objects of art, are freely introduced; to this the term is now usually applied, the other being distinguished as Moorish Arabesque, or Moresque."

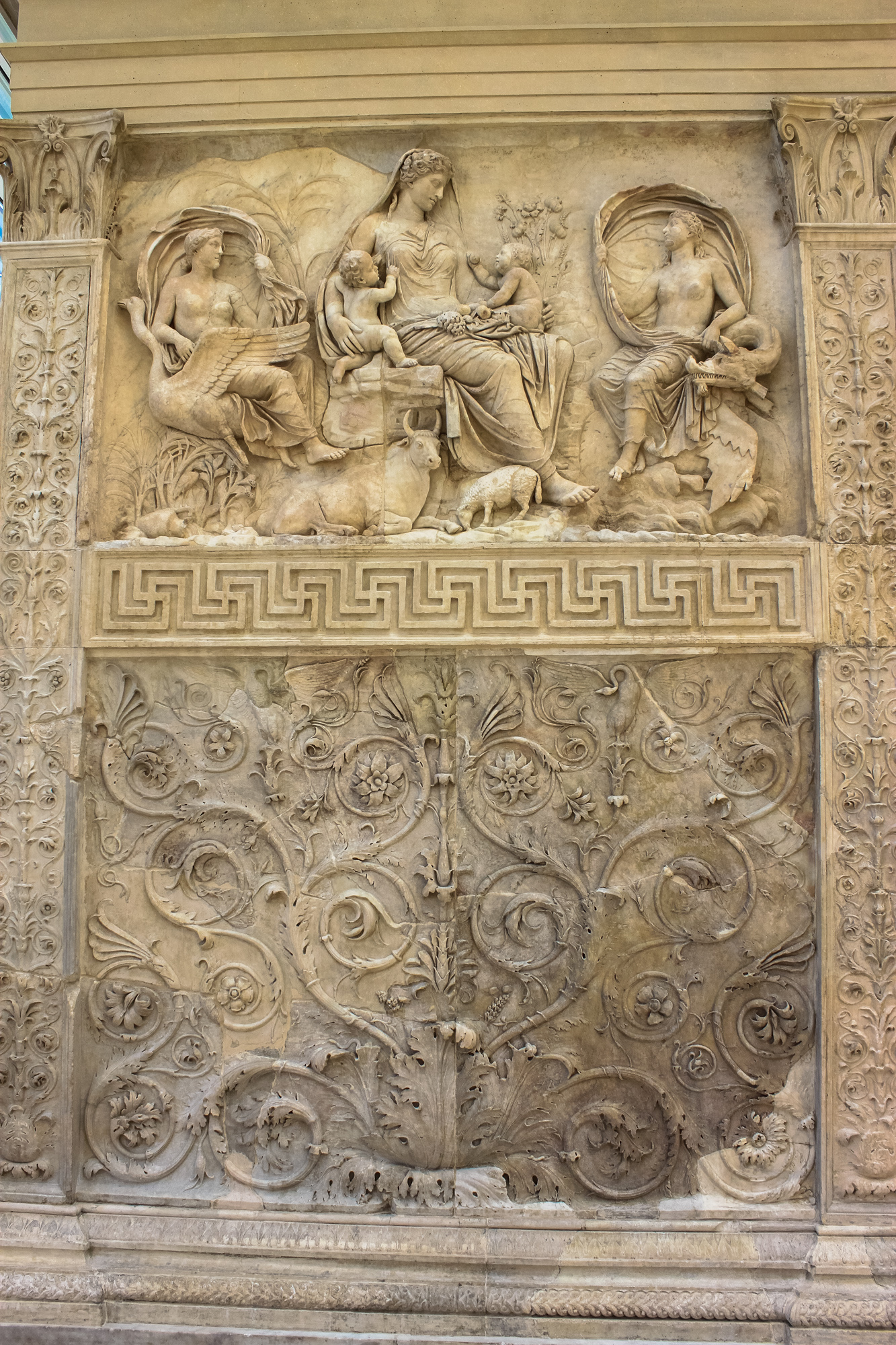
Roman - Arabesque on the Ara Pacis, Rome, unknown architect and sculptors, 13-9 BC

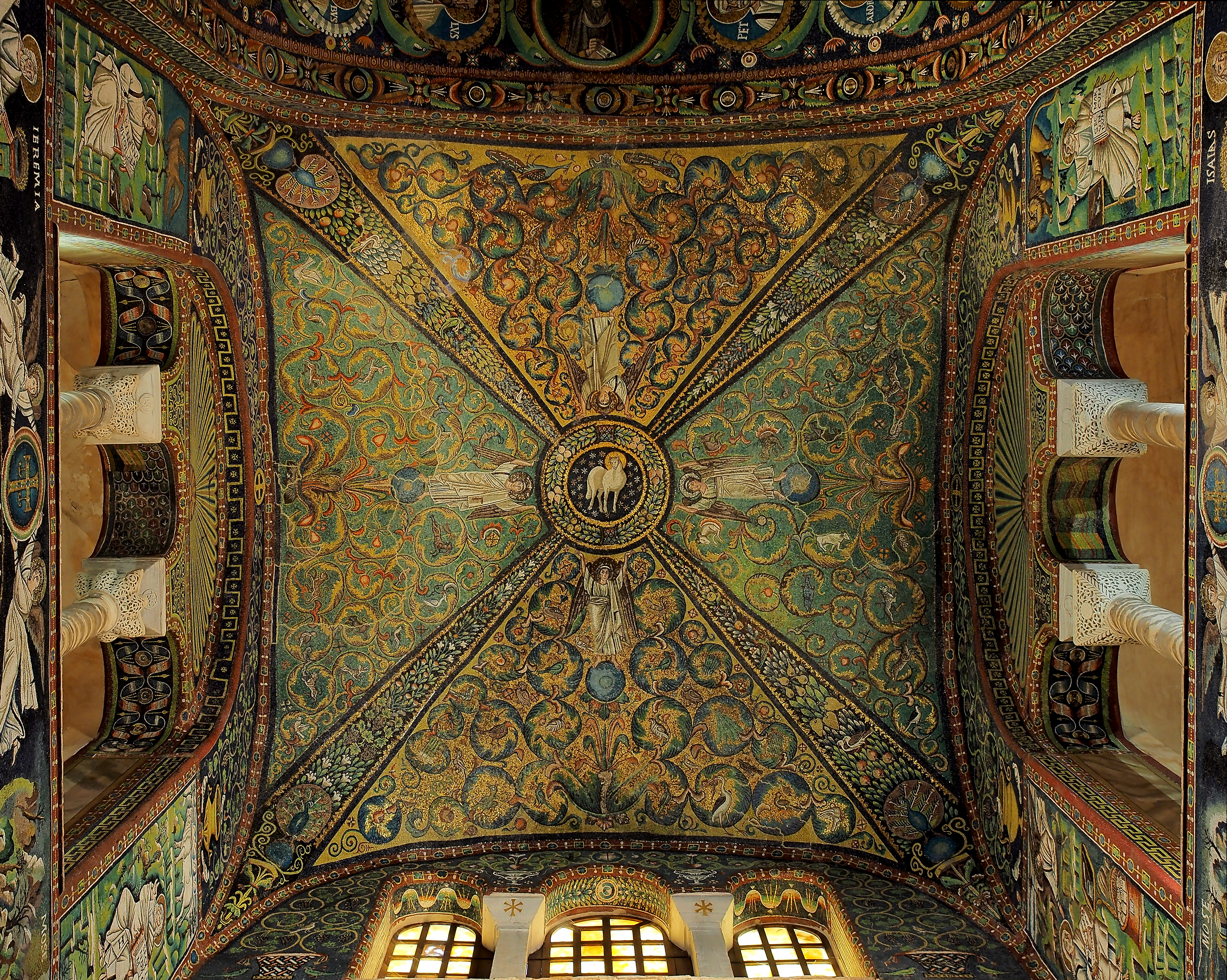
Byzantine - Mosaics with arabesques on a ceiling from the Basilica of San Vitale, Ravenna, Italy

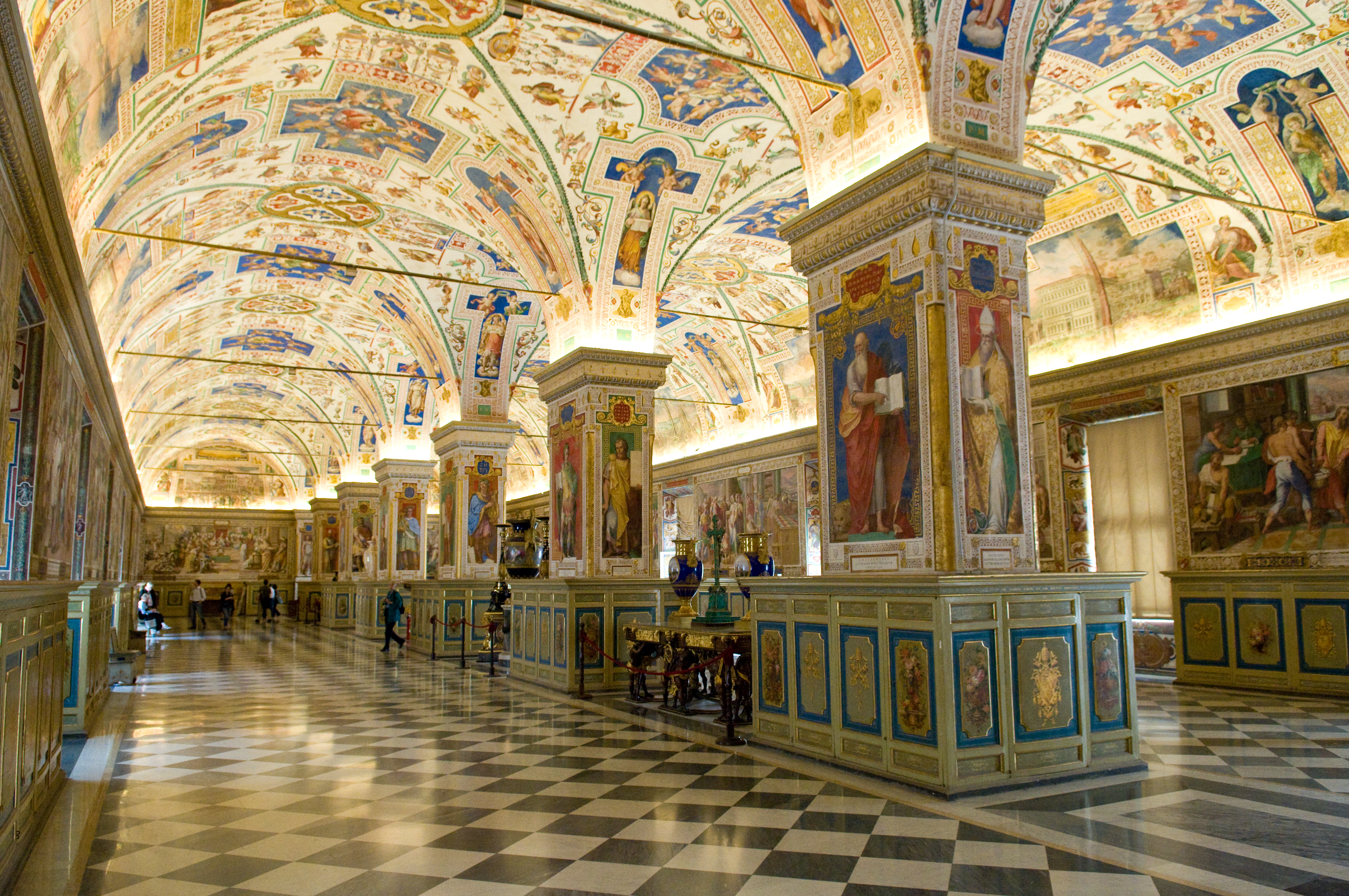
Renaissance - Ceilings decorated with arabesques in the Vatican Library, Vatican City, by Domenico Fontana, 1587-1588

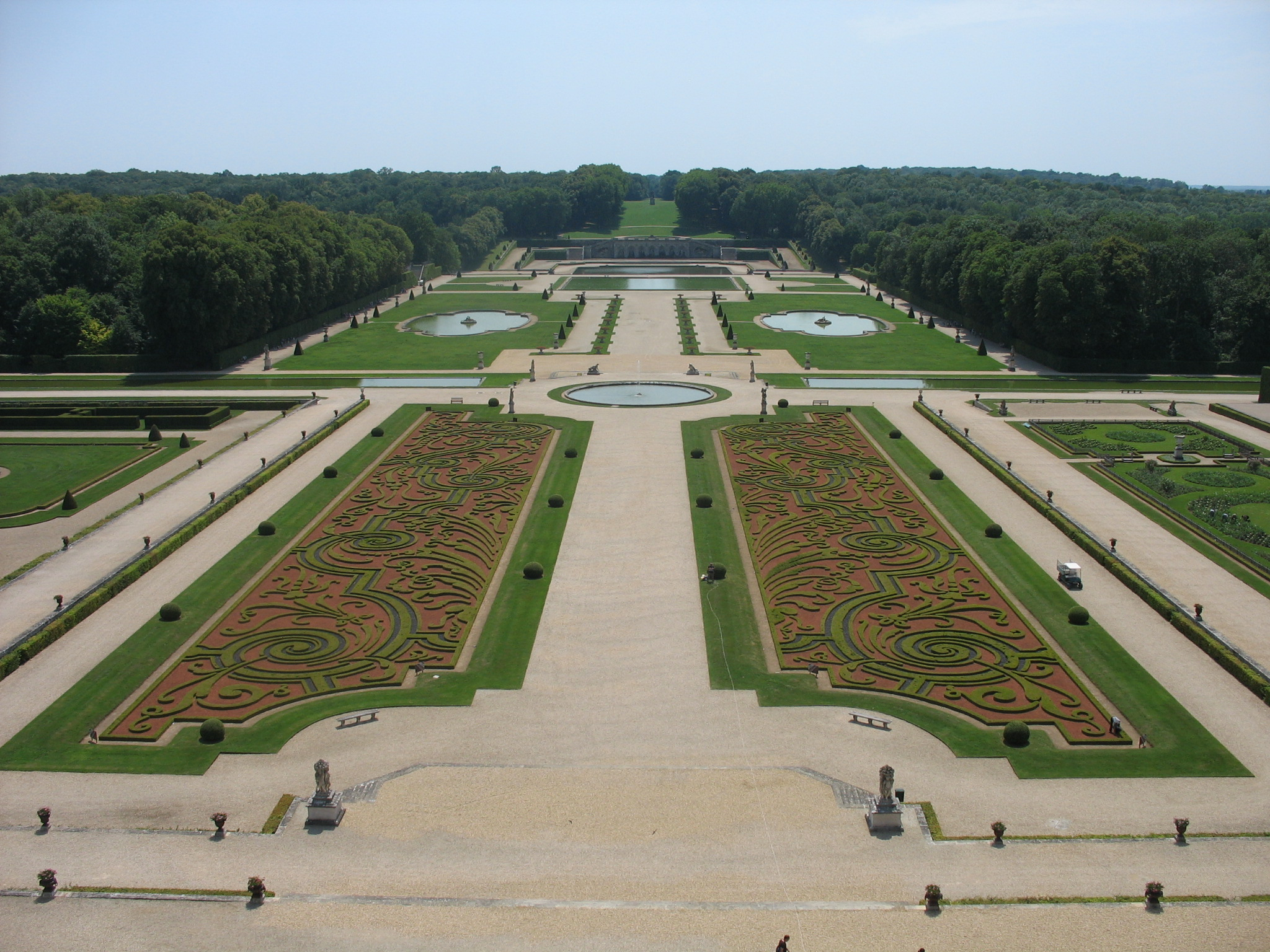
Baroque - Gardens at Vaux-le-Vicomte, France, by André Le Nôtre, 1657–1661

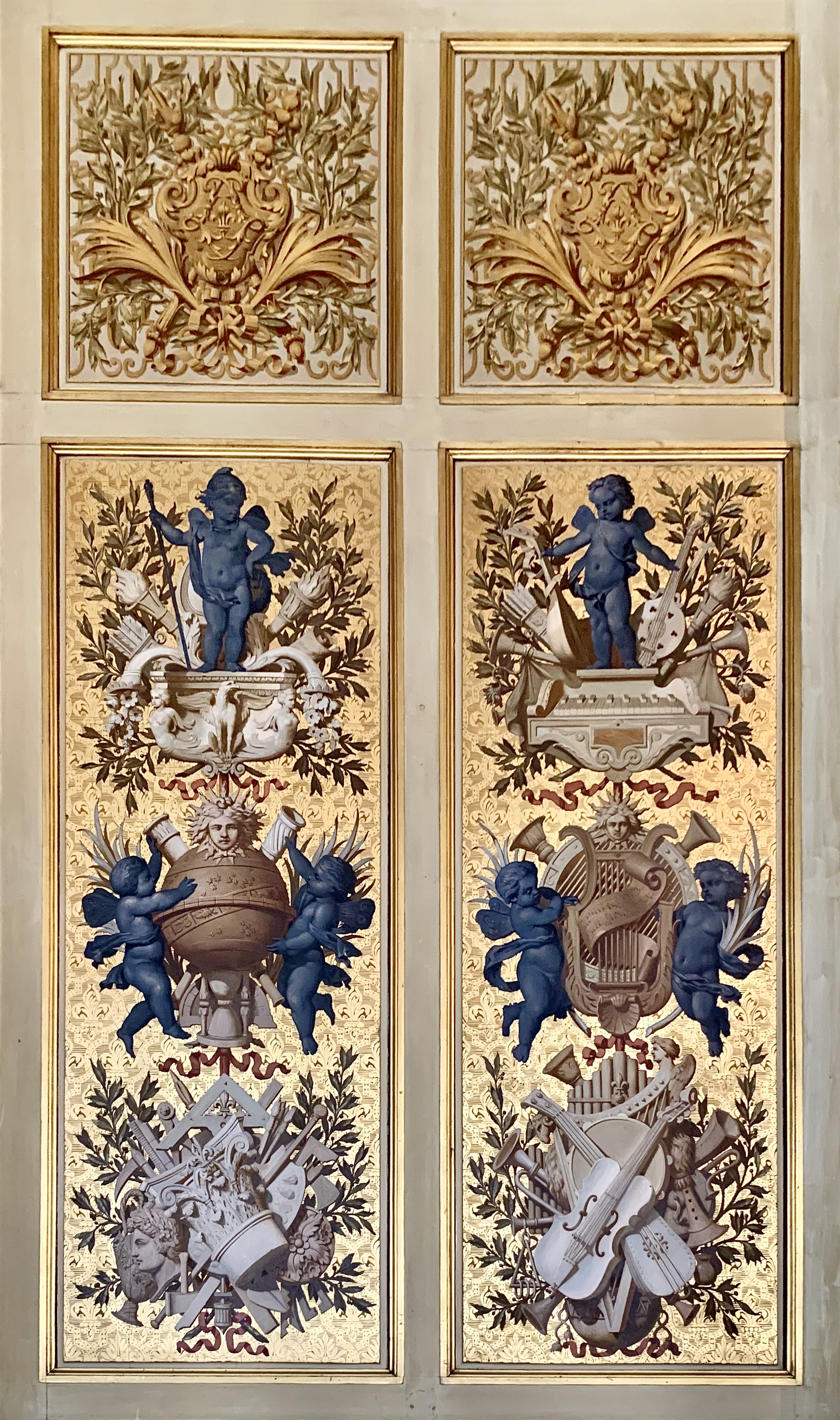
Baroque - Arabesques on a door in the Galerie d'Apollon, Louvre Palace, Paris, by Louis Le Vau and Charles Le Brun, after 1661

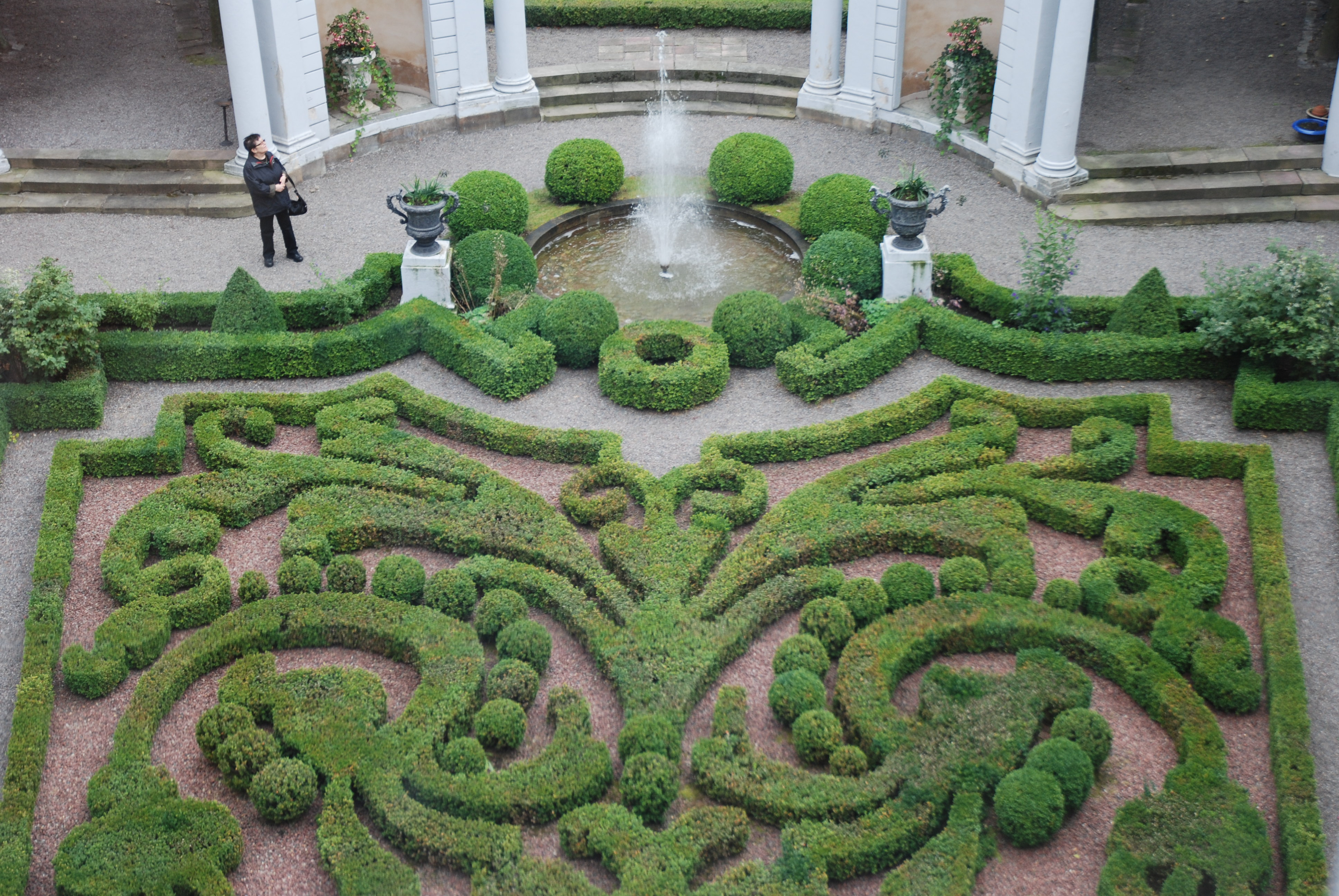
Baroque - Garden of the Tessin Palace, Stockholm, Sweden, by Nicodemus Tessin the Younger, 1692–1700

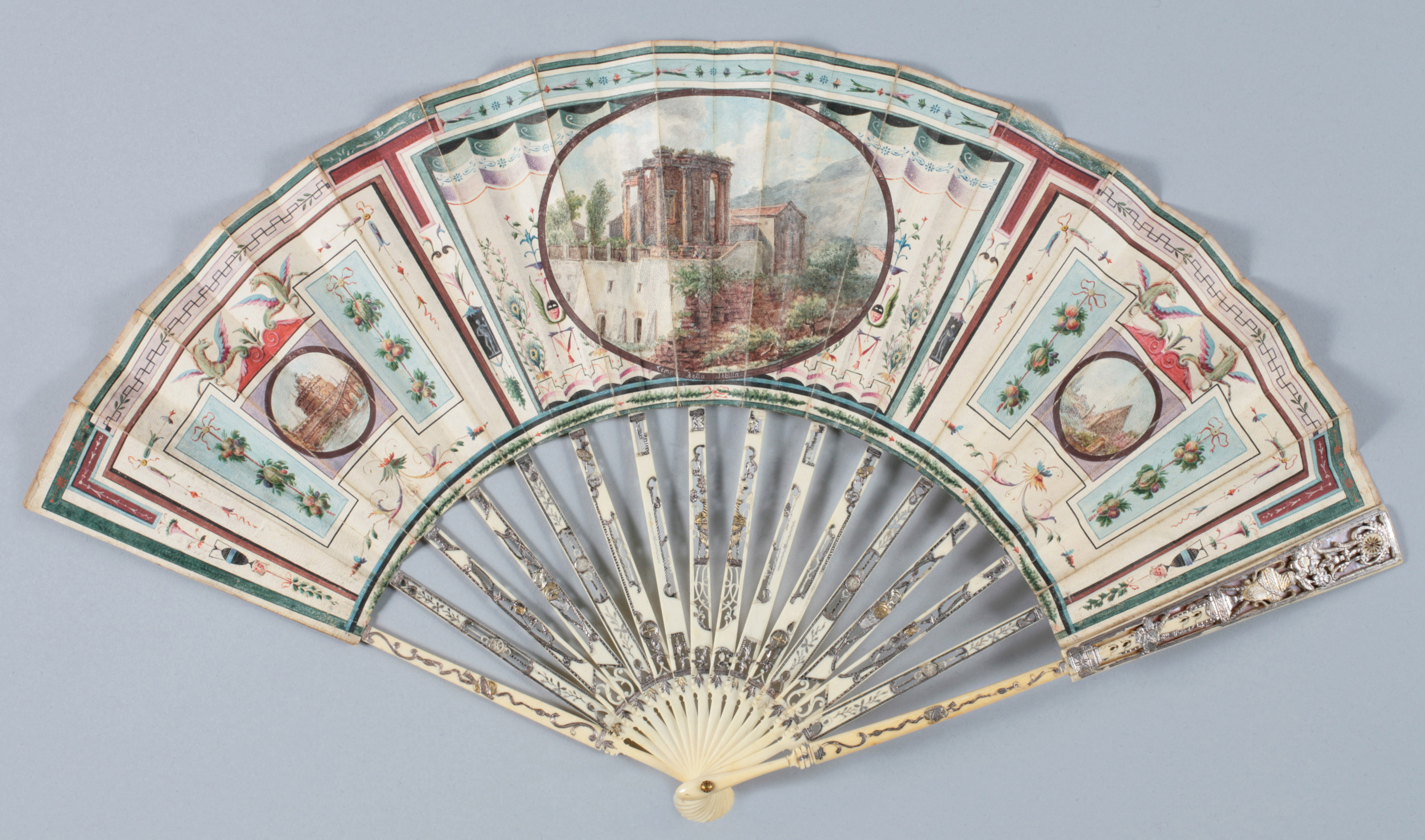
Neoclassical - Fan inspired by Roman frescos in Pompeian Styles, unknown designer and painter, 1780-1800, leather, gouache, ivory, and gilding, Musée Galliera, Paris

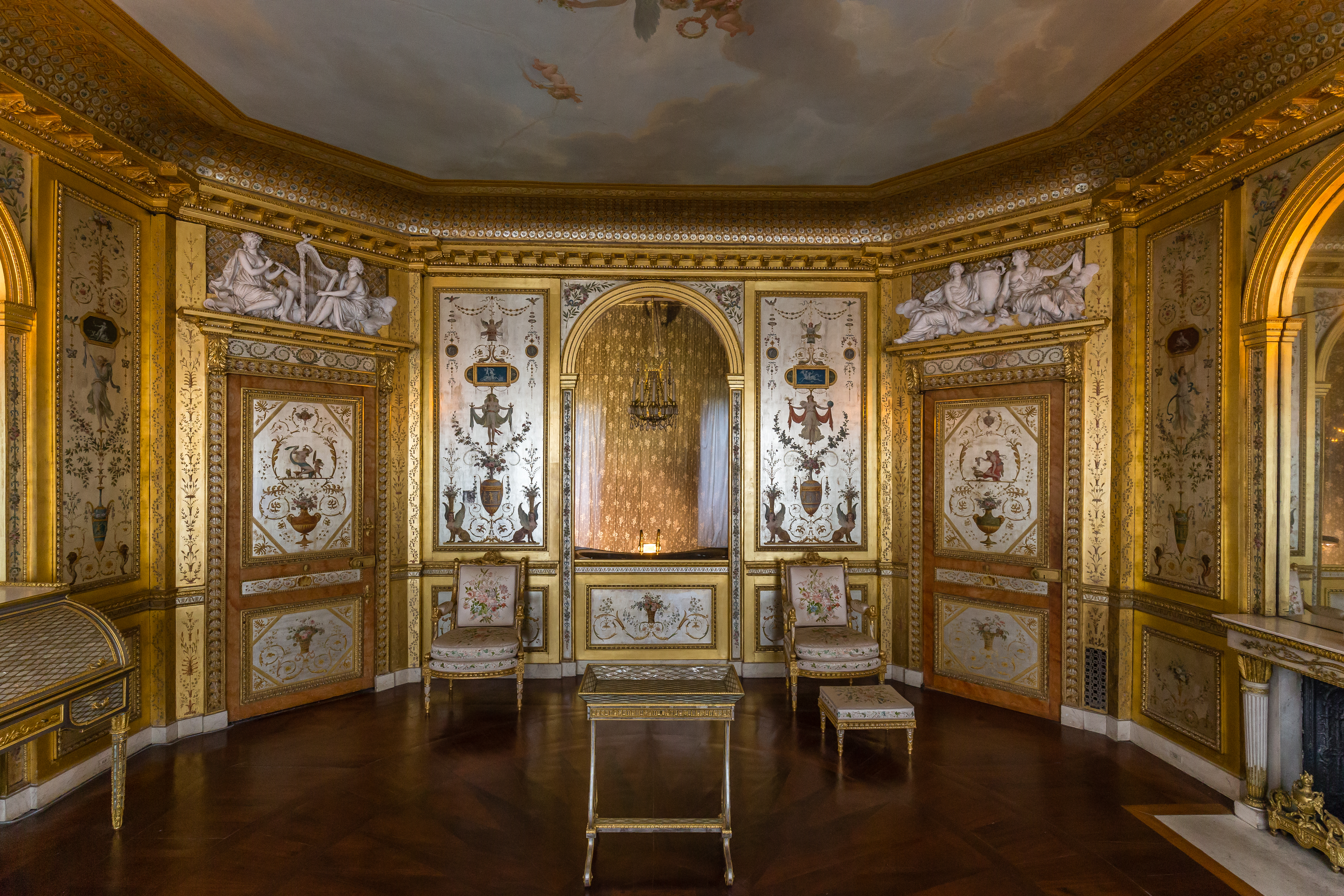
Louis XVI style - The Boudoir of Marie-Antoinette, Palace of Fontainebleau, Fontainebleau, France, decorated with arabesques in the Pompeiian Style, by the Rousseau brothers, 1785

Neoclassical - Door, by Pierre Rousseau, 1790s, oil on panel, Cleveland Museum of Art, Cleveland, US

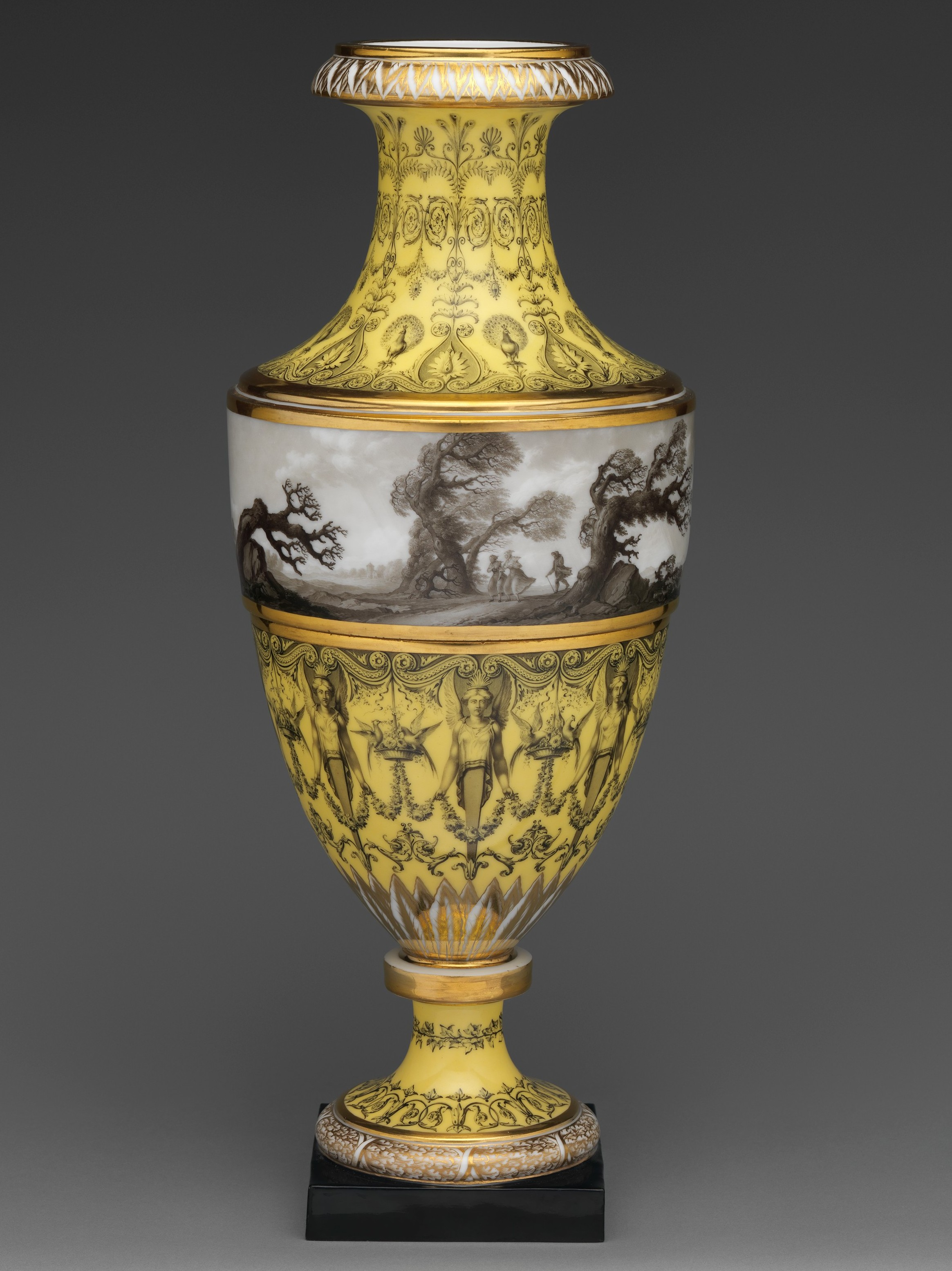
Neoclassical - vase with scenes of storm on land and arabesques, by the Duc d'Angoulême's porcelain factory, c.1797-1798, hard-paste porcelain, Metropolitan Museum of Art, New York

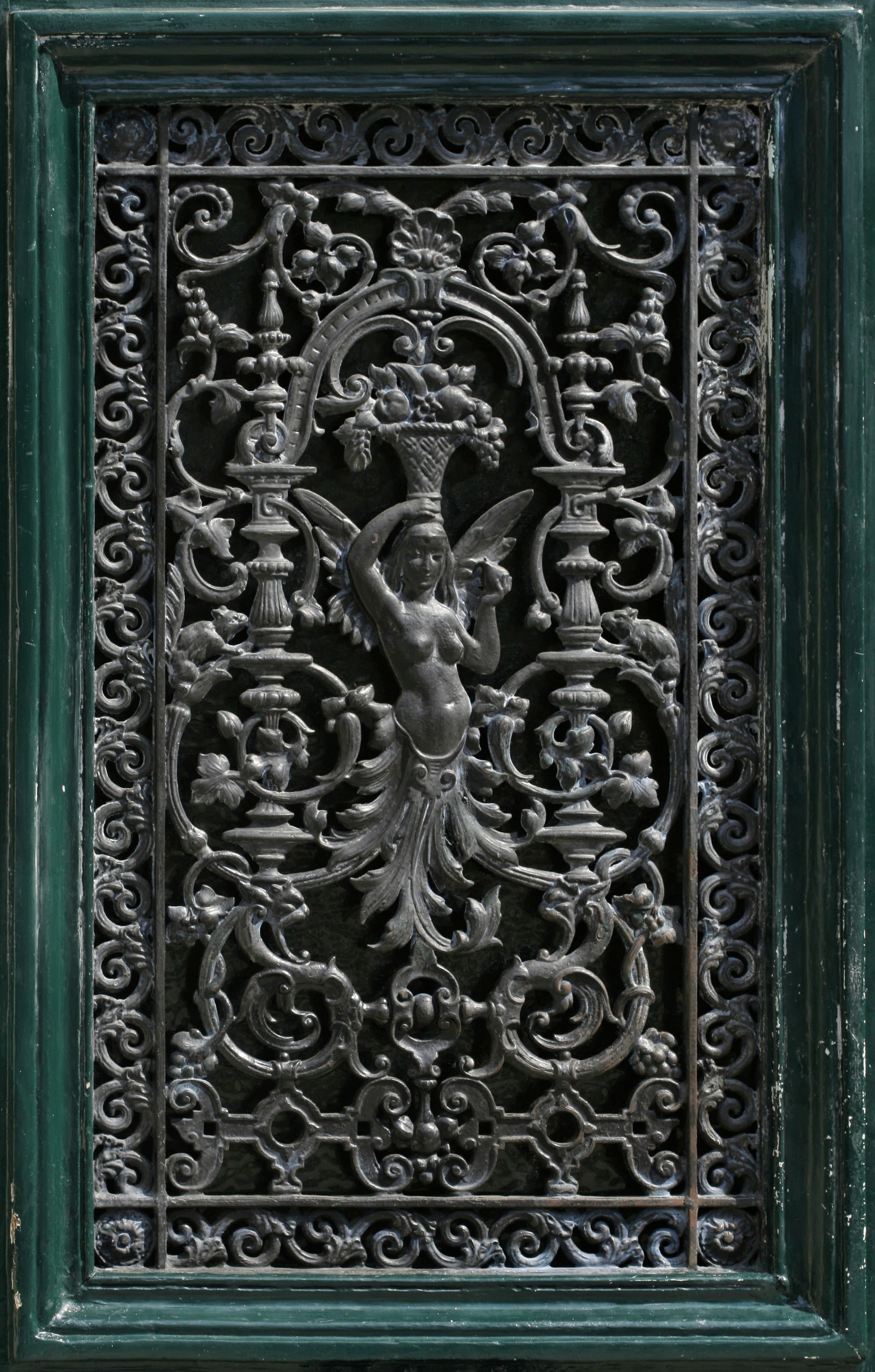
Renaissance Revival - Cast iron door window grill of a building on the Boulevard du Temple no. 42, Paris, unknown architect, c.1850

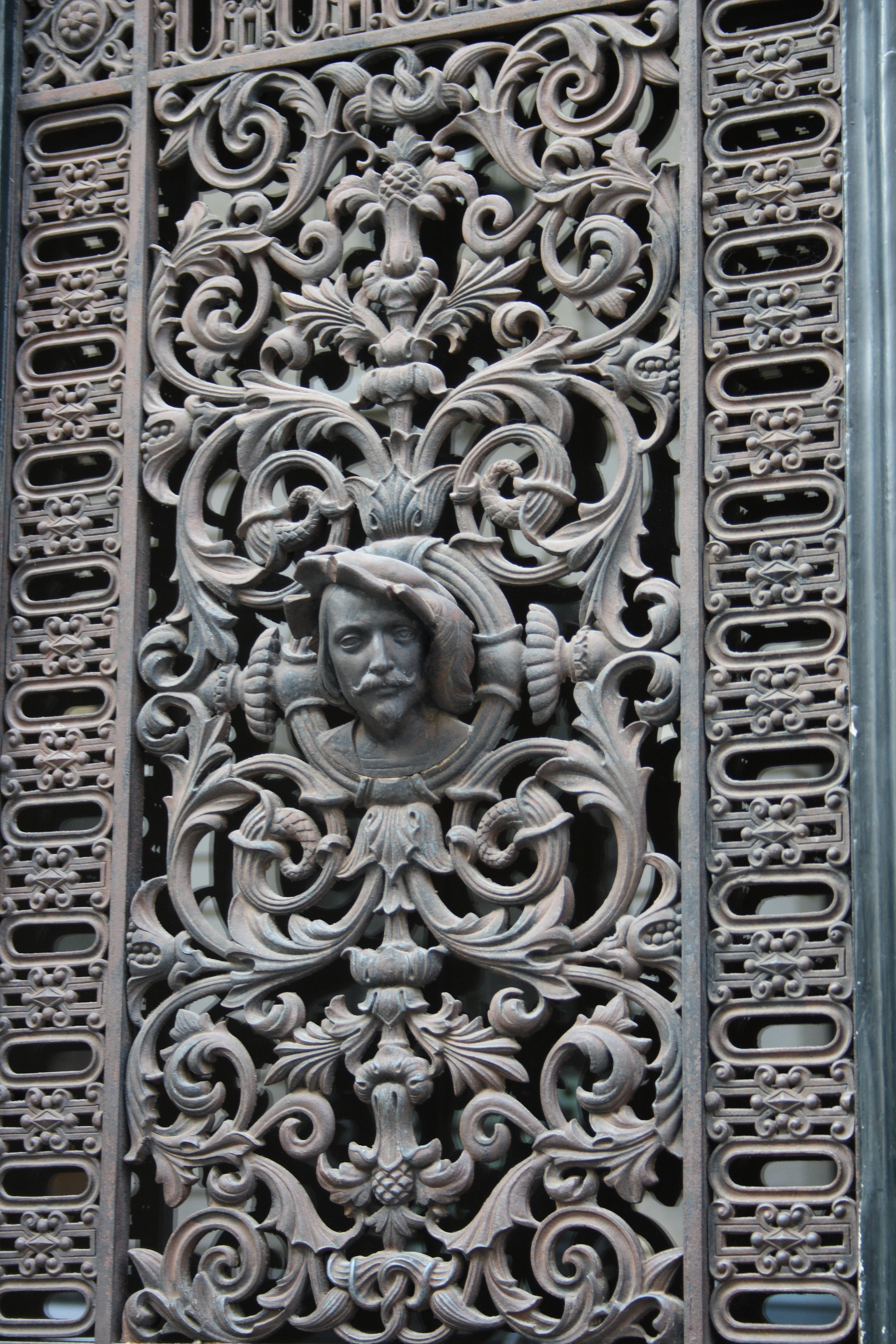
Renaissance Revival - Cast iron door window grill of Rue du Bac no. 34, Paris, unknown architect, c.1850

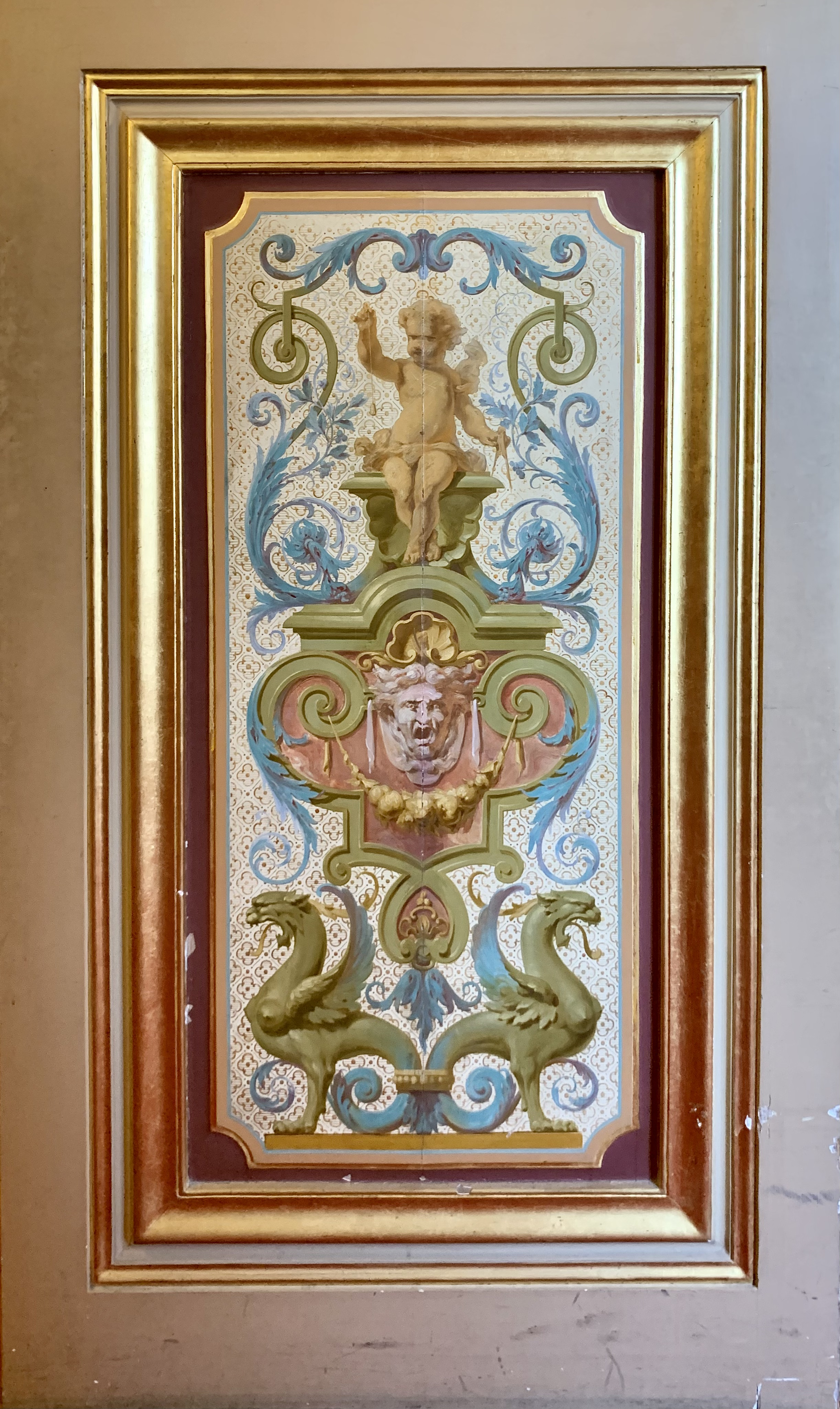
Baroque Revival (inspired by those from the Louis XIV style) - Arabesque panel in the Napoleon III Apartments of the Louvre Palace, unknown painted and designer, c.1860

== Printing ==
A major use of the arabesque style has been artistic printing, for example of book covers and page decoration. Repeating geometric patterns worked well with traditional printing, since they could be printed from metal type like letters if the type was placed together; as the designs have no specific connection to the meaning of a text, the type can be reused in many different editions of different works. Robert Granjon, a French printer of the sixteenth century, has been credited with the first truly interlocking arabesque printing, but other printers had used many other kinds of ornaments in the past. The idea was rapidly used by many other printers. After a period of disuse in the nineteenth century, when a more minimal page layout became popular with printers like Bodoni and Didot, the concept returned to popularity with the arrival of the Arts and Crafts movement, Many fine books from the period 1890–1960 have arabesque decorations, sometimes on paperback covers. Many digital serif fonts include arabesque pattern elements thought to be complementary to the mood of the font; they are also often sold as separate designs.

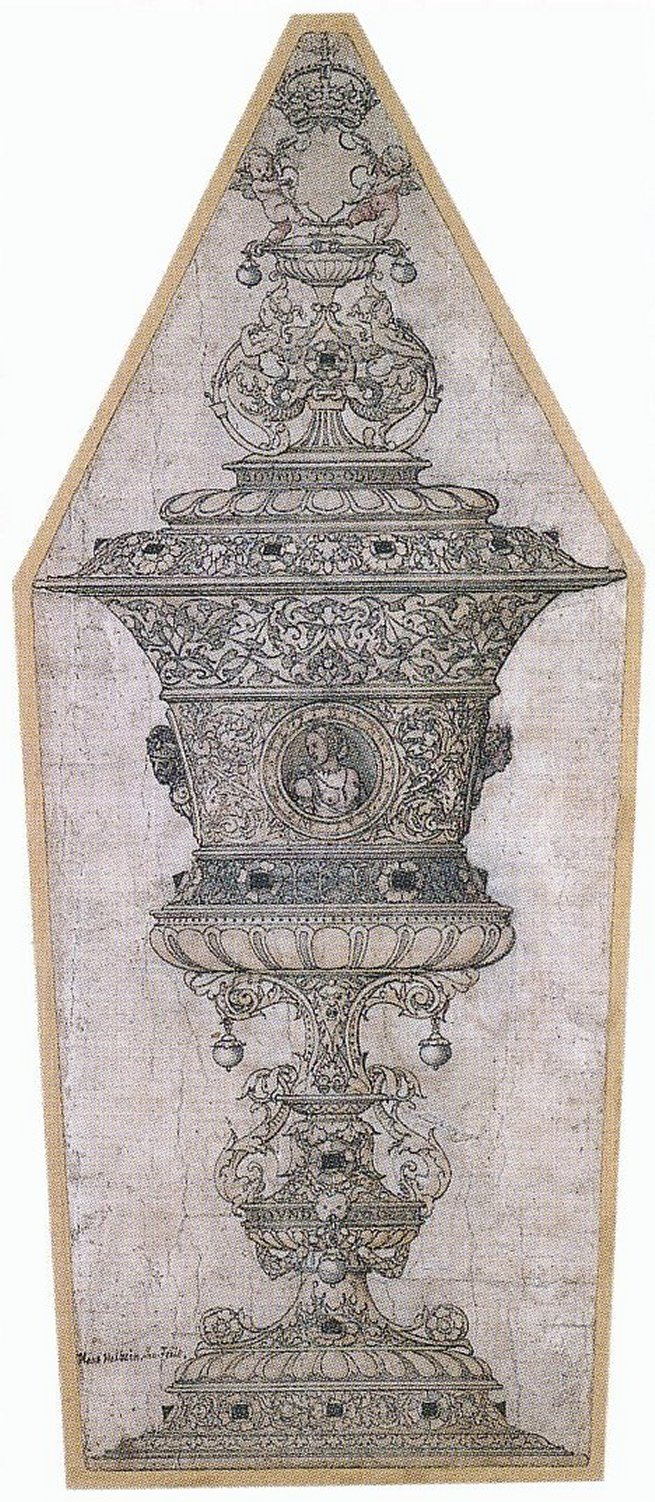
Design for a Cup for Jane Seymour, Hans Holbein the Younger, 1536, with zones in both Islamic-derived arabesques or moresques, and classically derived acanthus volutes

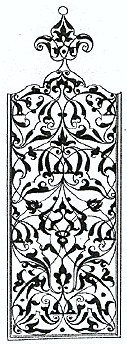
Arabesque or moresque ornament print, by Peter Flötner (d. 1546)

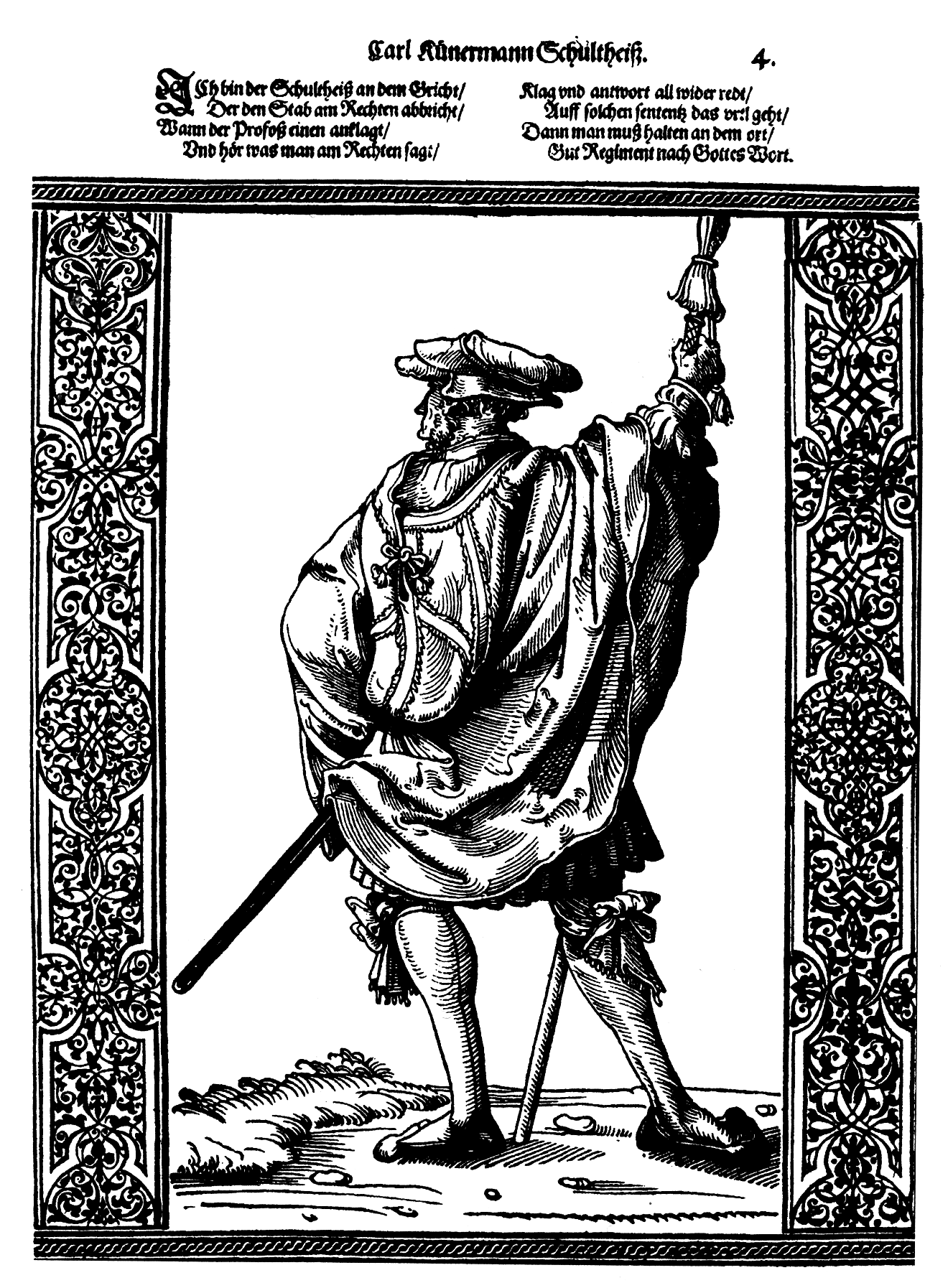
Arabesque or moresque borders in a print by Peter Flötner

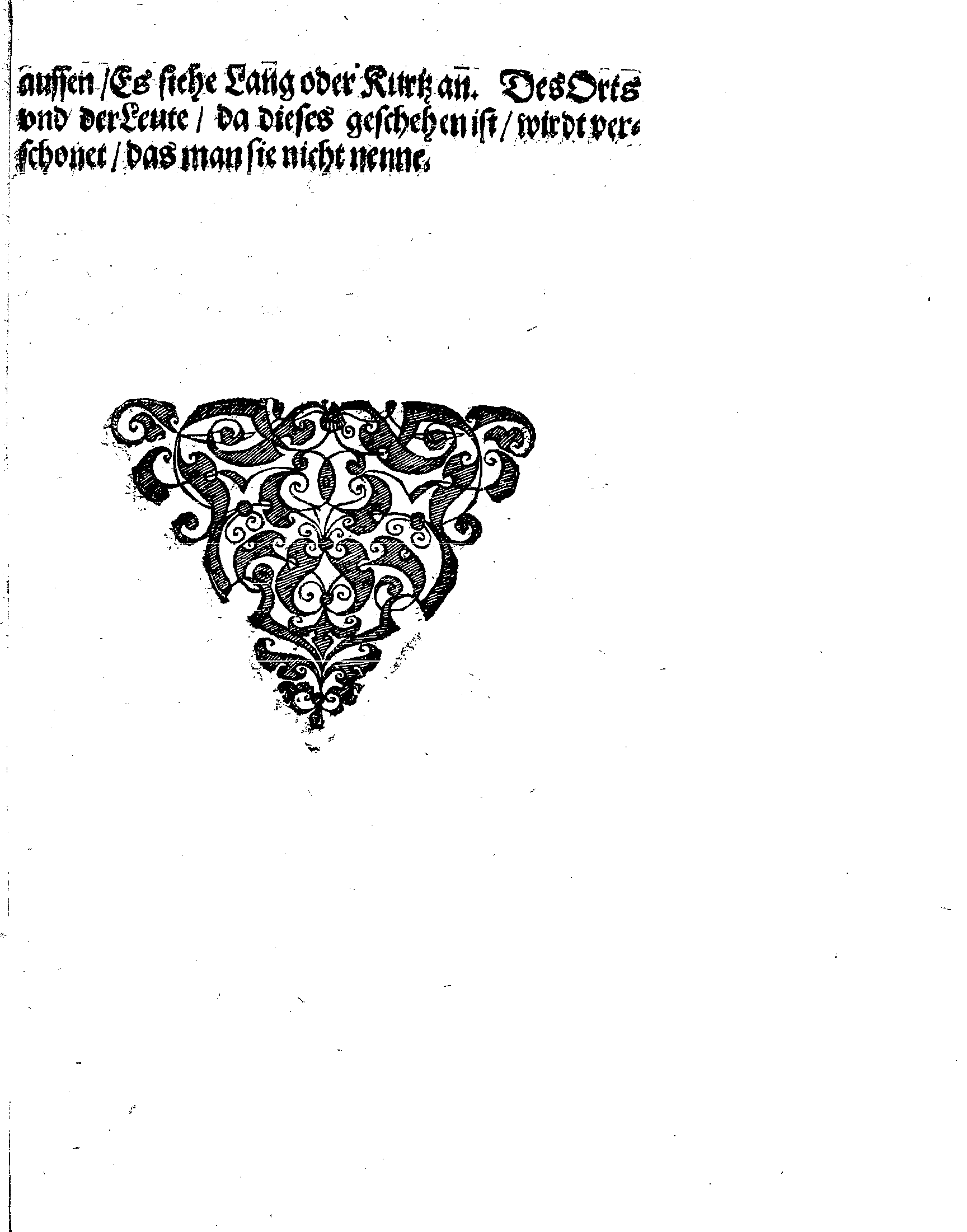
Arabesque/moresque printers ornament, German, 17th century

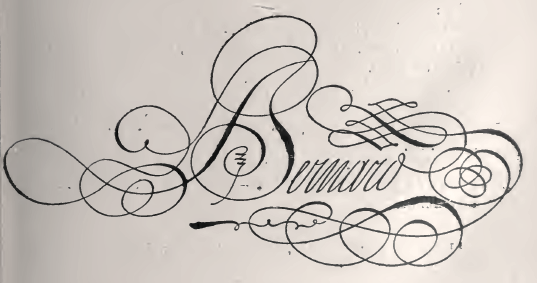
Arabesque pen flourishes on a signature
