= Jean-François Callet =

Jean-François Callet (25 October 1744 – 14 November 1798) was a French professor of mathematics who wrote an influential compilation of logarithmic tables and taught spherical trigonometry and navigation.

Callet was born in Versailles and became a professor of hydrographic engineering. His most influential work was Tables Portatives de Logarithmes, published in 1795: a compilation of logarithmic tables, based on the work of William Gardiner, which remained in print until 1906. Its roughly 800 pages give logarithms of the sine, cosine and tangent, as well as natural sines and cosines. It was influential, leading to other improved tables such as those of Edward Sang. Another of Callet's works was a spherical trigonometry text for use in navigation, published in 1798 and written in collaboration with instrument maker Jean François Richer, who was attempting to create a navigation instrument called the trigonometric compass in his application for the Abbé Raynal Prize. The prize was then being offered for a reliable and accurate method to reduce the apparent distance between two stars to the true distance, which could be used to determine the longitude of a ship's position. Richer's application won the 1791 prize.
