= Firmin Didot =

French printer, engraver, and type founder (1764–1836)

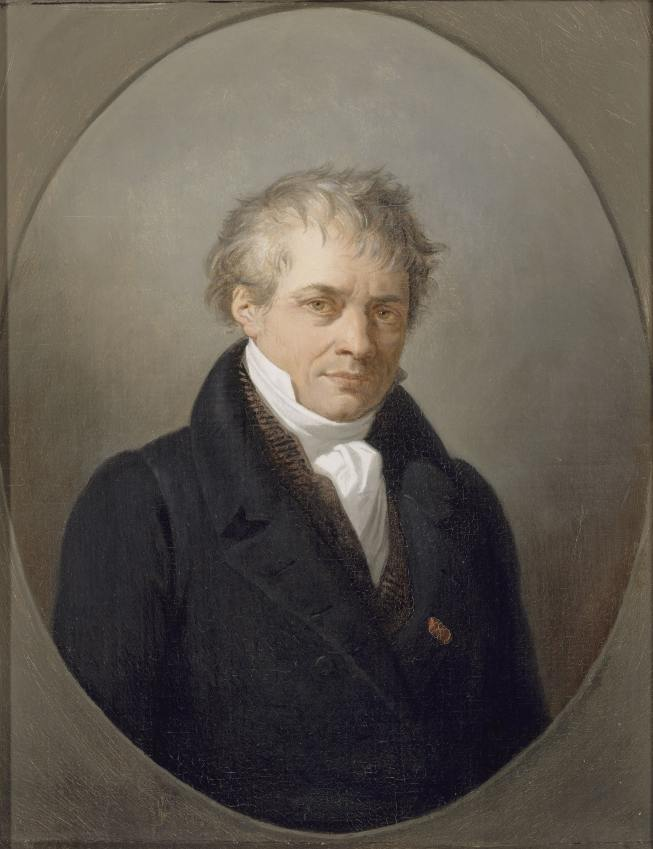
- Portrait of Firmin Didot by Charles Alexandre Debacq, 1823.
- Born: 14 April 1764; Paris
- Died: 24 April 1836 (aged 72); Mesnil-sur-l'Estrée
- Occupation: Translator, politician, printer, type founder, publisher, writer, book printer, bookseller
- Children: Ambroise Firmin Didot
- Relatives: Pierre Didot
- Awards: Chevalier of the Legion of Honour (1819)
- Position held: deputy (1827–1830), deputy (1830–1831), deputy (1831–1834), deputy (1834–1836)

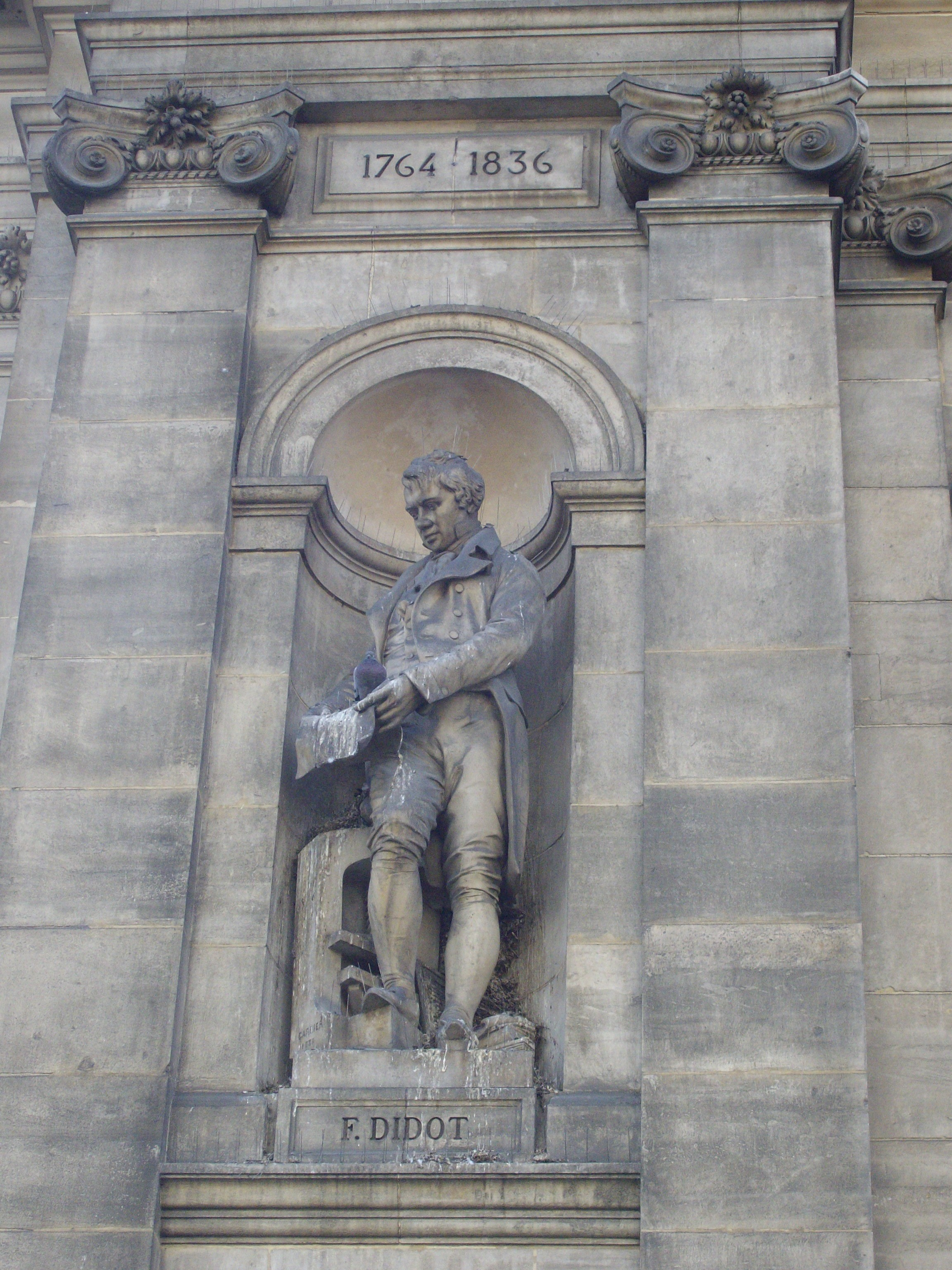
Firmin Didot statue, facade of the Hôtel de Ville, Paris

Firmin Didot (French: [fiʁmɛ̃ dido]; 14 April 1764 – 24 April 1836) was a French printer, engraver, and type founder.

== Early life ==
Firmin Didot was born in Paris into a family of printers founded by François Didot, the father of 11 children. Firmin was one of his grandchildren. The family's paper manufactory was located at Essonnes, a town c. 30 km southeast of Paris near Corbeil, which had notable paper factories.

== Work ==
Didot invented the word "stereotype", which in printing refers to the metal printing plate created for the actual printing of pages (as opposed to printing pages directly with movable type), and used the process extensively, revolutionizing the book trade by his cheap editions. His manufactory was a place of pilgrimage for the printers of the world.

He first used the process in his edition of Callet’s Tables of Logarithms (1795), in which he secured an accuracy till then unattainable. He published stereotyped editions of French, English and Italian classics at a very low price. At the 1798 Exposition des produits de l'industrie française Pierre and Firmin Didot and Louis Etienne Herhan won an honorable distinction, the highest award, for their "Superb edition of Virgil with characters and ink of their manufacture; a stereotype plate, and an in-12 edition of the works of Virgil and Lafontaine with these characters."

Didot was appointed by Napoleon as the director of the Imprimerie Impériale typefoundry.

He was also the author of two tragedies — La Reine de Portugal and La Mort d’Annibal — and he wrote metrical translations from Virgil, Tyrtaeus and Theocritus.

== Legacy ==
France is indebted to the Didot family for the publication of the Biographie Nationale, and Belgium is also indebted for the establishment of her Royal Press. Relatives of Firmin Didot include François Ambroise Didot (1730–1804); Pierre François Didot (1732–95); Henri Didot (1765–1862); and Pierre Didot (1760–1853).

Essai sur la Typographie by a member of the Didot family was published at Paris in 1852.

Along with Giambattista Bodoni of Italy, Firmin Didot is credited with establishing the use of the Didone or "Modern" style of serif typefaces. The types that Didot used are characterized by extreme contrast in thick strokes and thin strokes, by the use of hairline serifs and by the vertical stress of the letters. Many fonts today are available based on Firmin Didot's typefaces, and are often called Didot as a result.
