= William Gardiner (mathematician) =

English mathematician

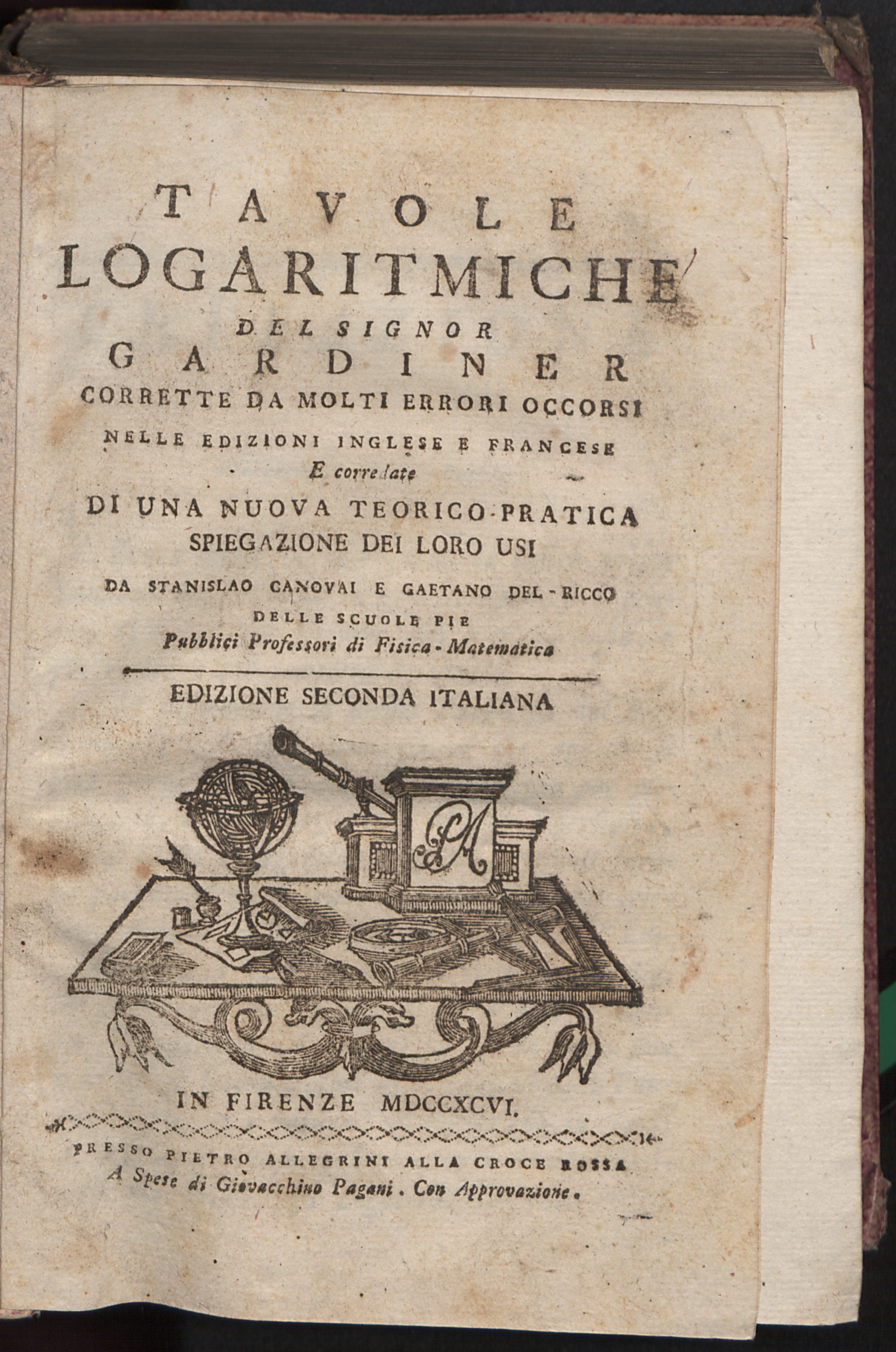
Tables of logarithms, 1796 edition

William Gardiner (died 1752) was an English mathematician. His logarithmic tables of sines and tangents (Tables of logarithms, 1742) had various reprints and saw use by scientists and other mathematicians.

== Works ==
- A literal exposition of two prophecies cited by St. Matthew out of the Old Testament (1726), reprinted as A literal exposition of two remarkable prophecies in the Old Testament : relating to Jesus Christ the Messiah (1728)
- Practical surveying improved : or, land-measuring, according to the present most correct methods.: 1737 (erroneously given as 1773 in Worldcat), many reprints
- Tables of logarithms, for all numbers from 1 to 102100, and for the sines and tangents to every ten seconds of each degree in the quadrant; as also, for the sines of the first 72 minutes to every single second; with other useful and necessary tables: 1742, reprinted many times, translated in French and Italian
