= Timeline of geometry =

Notable events in the history of geometry

The following is a timeline of key developments of geometry:

== Before 1000 BC ==
- ca. 2000 BC – Scotland, carved stone balls exhibit a variety of symmetries including all of the symmetries of Platonic solids.
- 1800 BC – Moscow Mathematical Papyrus, findings volume of a frustum
- 1800 BC – Plimpton 322 contains the oldest reference to the Pythagorean triplets.
- 1650 BC – Rhind Mathematical Papyrus, copy of a lost scroll from around 1850 BC, the scribe Ahmes presents one of the first known approximate values of π at 3.16, the first attempt at squaring the circle, earliest known use of a sort of cotangent, and knowledge of solving first order linear equations

== 1st millennium BC ==
- 800 BC – Baudhayana, author of the Baudhayana Sulba Sutra, a Vedic Sanskrit geometric text, contains quadratic equations, and calculates the square root of 2 correct to five decimal places
- ca. 600 BC – the other Vedic "Sulba Sutras" ("rule of chords" in Sanskrit) use Pythagorean triples, contain a number of geometrical proofs, and approximate π at 3.16
- 530 BC – Pythagoras studies propositional geometry and vibrating lyre strings; his group also discover the irrationality of the square root of two,
- 5th century BC – Hippocrates of Chios utilizes lunes in an attempt to square the circle
- 5th century BC – Apastamba, author of the Apastamba Sulba Sutra, another Vedic Sanskrit geometric text, makes an attempt at squaring the circle and also calculates the square root of 2 correct to five decimal places
- 370 BC – Eudoxus states the method of exhaustion for area determination
- 300 BC – Euclid in his Elements studies geometry as an axiomatic system, proves the infinitude of prime numbers and presents the Euclidean algorithm; he states the law of reflection in Catoptrics, and he proves the fundamental theorem of arithmetic
- 260 BC – Archimedes proved that the value of π lies between 3 + 1/7 (approx. 3.1429) and 3 + 10/71 (approx. 3.1408), that the area of a circle was equal to π multiplied by the square of the radius of the circle and that the area enclosed by a parabola and a straight line is 4/3 multiplied by the area of a triangle with equal base and height. He also gave a very accurate estimate of the value of the square root of 3.
- 225 BC – Apollonius of Perga writes On Conic Sections and names the ellipse, parabola, and hyperbola,
- 150 BC – Jain mathematicians in India write the "Sthananga Sutra", which contains work on the theory of numbers, arithmetical operations, geometry, operations with fractions, simple equations, cubic equations, quartic equations, and permutations and combinations
- 140 BC – Hipparchus develops the bases of trigonometry.

== 1st millennium ==
- ca 340 – Pappus of Alexandria states his hexagon theorem and his centroid theorem
- 50 – Aryabhata writes the "Aryabhata-Siddhanta", which first introduces the trigonometric functions and methods of calculating their approximate numerical values. It defines the concepts of sine and cosine, and also contains the earliest tables of sine and cosine values (in 3.75-degree intervals from 0 to 90 degrees)
- 7th century – Bhaskara I gives a rational approximation of the sine function
- 8th century – Virasena gives explicit rules for the Fibonacci sequence, gives the derivation of the volume of a frustum using an infinite procedure.
- 8th century – Shridhara gives the rule for finding the volume of a sphere and also the formula for solving quadratic equations
- 820 – Al-Mahani conceived the idea of reducing geometrical problems such as doubling the cube to problems in algebra.
- ca. 900 – Abu Kamil of Egypt had begun to understand what we would write in symbols as $x^n \cdot x^m = x^{m+n}$
- 975 – Al-Batani – Extended the Indian concepts of sine and cosine to other trigonometrical ratios, like tangent, secant and their inverse functions. Derived the formula: $\sin \alpha = \tan \alpha / \sqrt{1+\tan^2 \alpha}$ and $\cos \alpha = 1 / \sqrt{1 + \tan^2 \alpha}$.

== 1000–1500 ==
- ca. 1000 – Law of sines is discovered by Muslim mathematicians, but it is uncertain who discovers it first between Abu-Mahmud al-Khujandi, Abu Nasr Mansur, and Abu al-Wafa.
- ca. 1100 – Omar Khayyám "gave a complete classification of cubic equations with geometric solutions found by means of intersecting conic sections." He became the first to find general geometric solutions of cubic equations and laid the foundations for the development of analytic geometry and non-Euclidean geometry. He also extracted roots using the decimal system (Hindu–Arabic numeral system).
- 1135 – Sharafeddin Tusi followed al-Khayyam's application of algebra to geometry, and wrote a treatise on cubic equations which "represents an essential contribution to another algebra which aimed to study curves by means of equations, thus inaugurating the beginning of algebraic geometry."
- ca. 1250 – Nasir Al-Din Al-Tusi attempts to develop a form of non-Euclidean geometry.
- 15th century – Nilakantha Somayaji, a Kerala school mathematician, writes the "Aryabhatiya Bhasya", which contains work on infinite-series expansions, problems of algebra, and spherical geometry

== 17th century ==
- 17th century – Putumana Somayaji writes the "Paddhati", which presents a detailed discussion of various trigonometric series
- 1619 – Johannes Kepler discovers two of the Kepler-Poinsot polyhedra.
- 1637 - René Descartes publishes La Géométrie which introduces analytic geometry, which involves reducing geometry to a form of arithmetic and algebra and translating geometric shapes into algebraic equations.

== 18th century ==
- 1722 – Abraham de Moivre states de Moivre's formula connecting trigonometric functions and complex numbers,
- 1733 – Giovanni Gerolamo Saccheri studies what geometry would be like if Euclid's fifth postulate were false,
- 1796 – Carl Friedrich Gauss proves that the regular 17-gon can be constructed using only a compass and straightedge
- 1797 – Caspar Wessel associates vectors with complex numbers and studies complex number operations in geometrical terms,
- 1799 – Gaspard Monge publishes Géométrie descriptive, in which he introduces descriptive geometry.

== 19th century ==
- 1806 – Louis Poinsot discovers the two remaining Kepler-Poinsot polyhedra.
- 1829 – Bolyai, Gauss, and Lobachevsky invent hyperbolic non-Euclidean geometry,
- 1837 – Pierre Wantzel proves that doubling the cube and trisecting the angle are impossible with only a compass and straightedge, as well as the full completion of the problem of constructibility of regular polygons
- 1843 – William Hamilton discovers the calculus of quaternions and deduces that they are non-commutative,
- 1854 – Bernhard Riemann introduces Riemannian geometry,
- 1854 – Arthur Cayley shows that quaternions can be used to represent rotations in four-dimensional space,
- 1858 – August Ferdinand Möbius invents the Möbius strip,
- 1870 – Felix Klein constructs an analytic geometry for Lobachevski's geometry thereby establishing its self-consistency and the logical independence of Euclid's fifth postulate,
- 1873 – Charles Hermite proves that e is transcendental,
- 1878 – Charles Hermite solves the general quintic equation by means of elliptic and modular functions
- 1882 – Ferdinand von Lindemann proves that π is transcendental and that therefore the circle cannot be squared with a compass and straightedge,
- 1882 – Felix Klein discovers the Klein bottle,
- 1899 – David Hilbert presents a set of self-consistent geometric axioms in Foundations of Geometry

== 20th century ==
- 1901 – Élie Cartan develops the exterior derivative,
- 1912 – Luitzen Egbertus Jan Brouwer presents the Brouwer fixed-point theorem,
- 1916 – Einstein's theory of general relativity.
- 1930 – Casimir Kuratowski shows that the three-cottage problem has no solution,
- 1931 – Georges de Rham develops theorems in cohomology and characteristic classes,
- 1933 – Karol Borsuk and Stanislaw Ulam present the Borsuk-Ulam antipodal-point theorem,
- 1955 – H. S. M. Coxeter et al. publish the complete list of uniform polyhedron,
- 1975 – Benoit Mandelbrot, fractals theory,
- 1981 – Mikhail Gromov develops the theory of hyperbolic groups, revolutionizing both infinite group theory and global differential geometry,
- 1983 – the classification of finite simple groups, a collaborative work involving some hundred mathematicians and spanning thirty years, is completed,
- 1991 – Alain Connes and John Lott develop non-commutative geometry,
- 1998 – Thomas Callister Hales proves the Kepler conjecture,

== 21st century ==
- 2003 – Grigori Perelman proves the Poincaré conjecture,
- 2007 – a team of researchers throughout North America and Europe used networks of computers to map E8 (mathematics).

== See also ==
- History of geometry – Historical development of geometry
- Timeline of ancient Greek mathematicians
- Timeline of mathematical logic
- Timeline of mathematics
