= Timeline of calculus and mathematical analysis =

A timeline of calculus and mathematical analysis.

== 500BC to 1600 ==
- 5th century BC - The Zeno's paradoxes,
- 5th century BC - Antiphon attempts to square the circle,
- 5th century BC - Democritus finds the volume of cone is 1/3 of volume of cylinder,
- 4th century BC - Eudoxus of Cnidus develops the method of exhaustion,
- 3rd century BC - Archimedes displays geometric series in The Quadrature of the Parabola. He further develops the method of exhaustion.
- 3rd century BC - Archimedes develops a concept of the indivisibles—a precursor to infinitesimals—allowing him to solve several problems using methods now termed as integral calculus. Archimedes also derives several formulae for determining the area and volume of various solids including sphere, cone, paraboloid and hyperboloid.
- Before 50 BC - Babylonian cuneiform tablets show use of the Trapezoid rule to calculate of the position of Jupiter.
- 3rd century - Liu Hui rediscovers the method of exhaustion in order to find the area of a circle.
- 4th century - The Pappus's centroid theorem,
- 5th century - Zu Chongzhi established a method that would later be called Cavalieri's principle to find the volume of a sphere.
- 600 - Liu Zhuo is the first person to use second-order interpolation for computing the positions of the sun and the moon.
- 665 - Brahmagupta discovers a second order Newton-Stirling interpolation for $\sin (x+\epsilon)$,
- 862 - The Banu Musa brothers write the "Book on the Measurement of Plane and Spherical Figures",
- 9th century - Thābit ibn Qurra discusses the quadrature of the parabola and the volume of different types of conic sections.
- 12th century - Bhāskara II discovers a rule equivalent to Rolle's theorem for $\sin x$,
- 14th century - Nicole Oresme proves of the divergence of the harmonic series,
- 14th century - Madhava discovers the power series expansion for $\sin x$, $\cos x$, $\arctan x$ and $\pi/4$ This theory is now well known in the Western world as the Taylor series or infinite series.
- 14th century - Parameshvara discovers a third order Taylor interpolation for $\sin (x+\epsilon)$,
- 1445 - Nicholas of Cusa attempts to square the circle,
- 1501 - Nilakantha Somayaji writes the Tantrasamgraha, which contains the Madhava's discoveries,
- 1548 - Francesco Maurolico attempted to calculate the barycenter of various bodies (pyramid, paraboloid, etc.),
- 1550 - Jyeshtadeva writes the Yuktibhāṣā, a commentary to Nilakantha's Tantrasamgraha,
- 1560 - Sankara Variar writes the Kriyakramakari,
- 1565 - Federico Commandino publishes De centro Gravitati,
- 1588 - Commandino's translation of Pappus' Collectio gets published,
- 1593 - François Viète discovers the first infinite product in the history of mathematics,

== 17th century ==
- 1606 - Luca Valerio applies methods of Archimedes to find volumes and centres of gravity of solid bodies,
- 1609 - Johannes Kepler computes the integral $\int_0^\theta \sin x\ dx = 1-\cos \theta$,
- 1611 - Thomas Harriot discovers an interpolation formula similar to Newton's interpolation formula,
- 1615 - Johannes Kepler publishes Nova stereometria doliorum,
- 1620 - Grégoire de Saint-Vincent discovers that the area under a hyperbola represented a logarithm,
- 1624 - Henry Briggs publishes Arithmetica Logarithmica,
- 1629 - Pierre de Fermat discovers his method of maxima and minima, precursor of the derivative concept,
- 1634 - Gilles de Roberval shows that the area under a cycloid is three times the area of its generating circle,
- 1635 - Bonaventura Cavalieri publishes Geometria Indivisibilibus,
- 1637 - René Descartes publishes La Géométrie,
- 1638 - Galileo Galilei publishes Two New Sciences,
- 1644 - Evangelista Torricelli publishes Opera geometrica,
- 1644 - Fermat's methods of maxima and minima published by Pierre Hérigone,
- 1647 - Cavalieri computes the integral $\int_0^a x^{n}\ dx=\frac{1}{n+1}a^{n+1}$,
- 1647 - Grégoire de Saint-Vincent publishes Opus Geometricum,
- 1650 - Pietro Mengoli proves of the divergence of the harmonic series,
- 1654 - Johannes Hudde discovers the power series expansion for $\ln(1+x)$,
- 1656 - John Wallis publishes Arithmetica Infinitorum,
- 1658 - Christopher Wren shows that the length of a cycloid is four times the diameter of its generating circle,
- 1659 - Second edition of Van Schooten's Latin translation of Descartes's Geometry with appendices by Hudde and Heuraet,
- 1665 - Isaac Newton discovers the generalized binomial theorem and develops his version of infinitesimal calculus,
- 1667 - James Gregory publishes Vera circuli et hyperbolae quadratura,
- 1668 - Nicholas Mercator publishes Logarithmotechnia,
- 1668 - James Gregory computes the integral of the secant function,
- 1669 - Newton invents a Newton's method for the computation of roots of a function,
- 1670 - Newton rediscovers the power series expansion for $\sin x$ and $\cos x$ (originally discovered by Madhava),
- 1670 - Isaac Barrow publishes Lectiones Geometricae,
- 1671 - James Gregory rediscovers the power series expansion for $\arctan x$ and $\pi/4$ (originally discovered by Madhava),
- 1672 - René-François de Sluse publishes A Method of Drawing Tangents to All Geometrical Curves,
- 1673 - Gottfried Leibniz also develops his version of infinitesimal calculus,
- 1675 - Leibniz uses the modern notation for an integral for the first time,
- 1677 - Leibniz discovers the rules for differentiating products, quotients, and the function of a function.
- 1683 - Jacob Bernoulli discovers the number e,
- 1684 - Leibniz publishes his first paper on calculus,
- 1685 - Newon formulates and solves Newton's minimal resistance problem, giving birth to the field of calculus of variations,
- 1686 - The first appearance in print of the $\int$ notation for integrals,
- 1687 - Isaac Newton publishes Philosophiæ Naturalis Principia Mathematica,
- 1691 - The first proof of Rolle's theorem is given by Michel Rolle,
- 1691 - Leibniz discovers the technique of separation of variables for ordinary differential equations,
- 1694 - Johann Bernoulli discovers the L'Hôpital's rule,
- 1696 - Guillaume de L'Hôpital publishes Analyse des Infiniment Petits, the first calculus textbook,
- 1696 - Jakob Bernoulli and Johann Bernoulli solve the brachistochrone problem.

== 18th century ==
- 1711 - Isaac Newton publishes De analysi per aequationes numero terminorum infinitas,
- 1712 - Brook Taylor develops Taylor series,
- 1722 - Roger Cotes computes the derivative of sine function in his Harmonia Mensurarum,
- 1730 - James Stirling publishes The Differential Method,
- 1734 - George Berkeley publishes The Analyst,
- 1734 - Leonhard Euler introduces the integrating factor technique for solving first-order ordinary differential equations,
- 1735 - Leonhard Euler solves the Basel problem, relating an infinite series to π,
- 1736 - Newton's Method of Fluxions posthumously published,
- 1737 - Thomas Simpson publishes Treatise of Fluxions,
- 1739 - Leonhard Euler solves the general homogeneous linear ordinary differential equation with constant coefficients,
- 1742 - Modern definion of logarithm by William Gardiner,
- 1742 - Colin Maclaurin publishes Treatise on Fluxions,
- 1748 - Euler publishes Introductio in analysin infinitorum,
- 1748 - Maria Gaetana Agnesi discusses analysis in Instituzioni Analitiche ad Uso della Gioventu Italiana,
- 1762 - Joseph Louis Lagrange discovers the divergence theorem,
- 1797 - Lagrange publishes Théorie des fonctions analytiques,

== 19th century ==
- 1807 - Joseph Fourier announces his discoveries about the trigonometric decomposition of functions,
- 1811 - Carl Friedrich Gauss discusses the meaning of integrals with complex limits and briefly examines the dependence of such integrals on the chosen path of integration,
- 1815 - Siméon Denis Poisson carries out integrations along paths in the complex plane,
- 1817 - Bernard Bolzano presents the intermediate value theorem — a continuous function which is negative at one point and positive at another point must be zero for at least one point in between,
- 1822 - Augustin-Louis Cauchy presents the Cauchy integral theorem for integration around the boundary of a rectangle in the complex plane,
- 1825 - Augustin-Louis Cauchy presents the Cauchy integral theorem for general integration paths—he assumes the function being integrated has a continuous derivative, and he introduces the theory of residues in complex analysis,
- 1825 - André-Marie Ampère discovers Stokes' theorem,
- 1828 - George Green introduces Green's theorem,
- 1831 - Mikhail Vasilievich Ostrogradsky rediscovers and gives the first proof of the divergence theorem earlier described by Lagrange, Gauss and Green,
- 1841 - Karl Weierstrass discovers but does not publish the Laurent expansion theorem,
- 1843 - Pierre-Alphonse Laurent discovers and presents the Laurent expansion theorem,
- 1850 - Victor Alexandre Puiseux distinguishes between poles and branch points and introduces the concept of essential singular points,
- 1850 - George Gabriel Stokes rediscovers and proves Stokes' theorem,
- 1861 - Karl Weierstrass starts to use the language of epsilons and deltas,
- 1873 - Georg Frobenius presents his method for finding series solutions to linear differential equations with regular singular points,

== 20th century ==
- 1908 - Josip Plemelj solves the Riemann problem about the existence of a differential equation with a given monodromic group and uses Sokhotsky - Plemelj formulae,
- 1966 - Abraham Robinson presents non-standard analysis.
- 1985 - Louis de Branges de Bourcia proves the Bieberbach conjecture,

== See also ==
- Timeline of ancient Greek mathematicians
- Timeline of geometry – Notable events in the history of geometry
- Timeline of mathematical logic
- Timeline of mathematics
