= Pierre Laurent =

Pierre Laurent may refer to:

- Pierre Laurent (politician) (born 1957), French politician and journalist
- Pierre Alphonse Laurent (1813–1854), French mathematician
- Pierre Laurent (footballer) (born 1970), French footballer
