= Pseudo-zero set =

In complex analysis (a branch of mathematical analysis), the pseudo-zero set or root neighborhood of a degree-m polynomial p(z) is the set of all complex numbers that are roots of polynomials whose coefficients differ from those of p by a small amount. Namely, given a norm |·| on the space $\mathbb{C}^{m+1}$ of polynomial coefficients, the pseudo-zero set is the set of all zeros of all degree-m polynomials q such that |p − q| (as vectors of coefficients) is less than a given ε.

== See also ==
- List of complex analysis topics
- Timeline of calculus and mathematical analysis
