= Yajnavalkya 95 Years Cycle =

Theory of Reconciliation of the lunar calendar and solar calendar

Details
- Theory of: Reconciliation of lunar calendar and solar calendar
- Key concepts: Spin - Axis phenomena
- Origin: India

General
- Related fields: Astronomy, Calendar
- Applications: Calendar

Yajnavalkya's 95-year cycle is a method of harmonizing the lunar and solar calendars. It was proposed by the ancient Indian sage Yajnavalkya, who is believed to have lived around the 9th - 8th century BCE. He was described as the greatest Brahmajnyani by all the sages at the philosophical function organised by king Janaka. This cycle of reconciliation is also known as Yajnavalkya Cycle.

Yajnavalkya was an Indian astronomer who studied the motion of Sun and mentioned these theories in his work Shatapatha Brahmana. He invented a method of reconciling the lunar calendar and the solar calendar. He described the 95-year cycle to synchronize the motions of the sun and the moon. It is mentioned as a 95 year “Agnichayana” in the 6th Kānda of Shatapatha Brahmana.

== Description ==
The lunar calendar is based on the cycle of the Moon and consists of 12 months of 29.5 days each. This means that the lunar calendar is about 11 days shorter than the solar calendar, which is based on the Earth's orbit around the Sun.

The Yajnavalkya 95-year cycle corrects this difference by adding an extra month (Adhik Maasa) to the lunar calendar every 32.5 years. This means that there will be 71 lunar years and 70 solar years in a 95-year cycle.

There is a logic behind this cycle that if the year is counted as 360 Tithis, then this leads to exactly 35 intercalary months (with a residual small error) in 95 years.

== Metonic Cycle ==
Yajnavalkya 95-years cycle consisted of five sub cycles of 19 years. The sub cycle of 19 years is called as Metonic Cycle in the modern times. The cycle of 19 years had been derived from the cycle of 95 years.
