= History of geometry =

Historical development of geometry

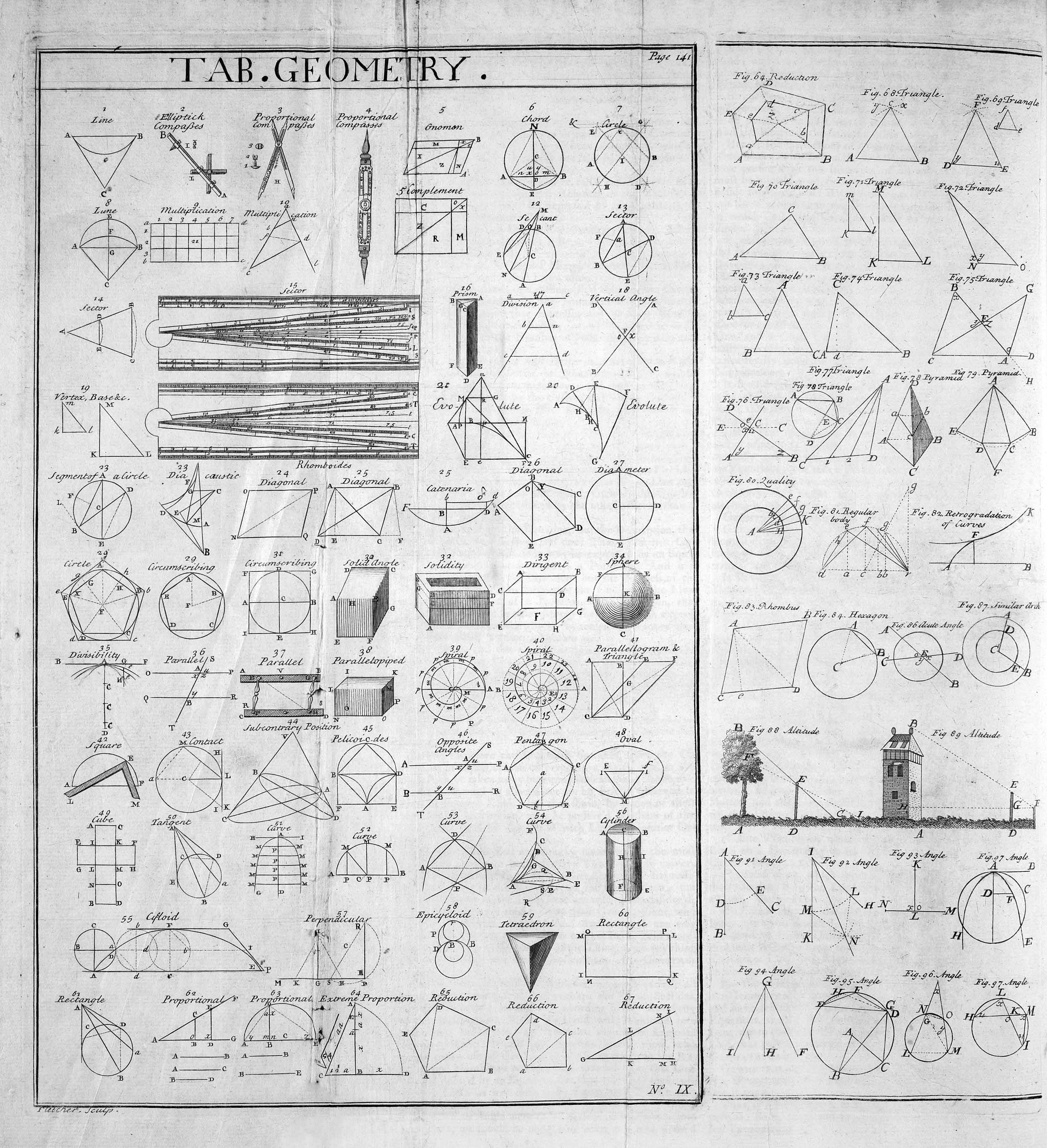
Part of the "Tab.Geometry." (Table of Geometry) from the 1728 Cyclopaedia

Geometry (from the Ancient Greek: γεωμετρία; geo- "earth", -metron "measurement") arose as the field of knowledge dealing with spatial relationships. Geometry was one of the two fields of pre-modern mathematics, the other being the study of numbers (arithmetic).

Classic geometry was focused in compass and straightedge constructions. Geometry was revolutionized by Euclid, who introduced mathematical rigor and the axiomatic method still in use today. His book, The Elements is widely considered the most influential textbook of all time, and was known to all educated people in the West until the middle of the 20th century.

In modern times, geometric concepts have been generalized to a high level of abstraction and complexity, and have been subjected to the methods of calculus and abstract algebra, so that many modern branches of the field are barely recognizable as the descendants of early geometry. (See Areas of mathematics and Algebraic geometry.)

== Early geometry ==
The earliest recorded beginnings of geometry can be traced to early peoples, such as the ancient Indus Valley (see Harappan mathematics) and ancient Babylonia (see Babylonian mathematics) from around 3000 BCE. Early geometry was a collection of empirically discovered principles concerning lengths, angles, areas, and volumes, which were developed to meet some practical need in surveying, construction, astronomy, and various crafts. Among these were some surprisingly sophisticated principles, and a modern mathematician might be hard put to derive some of them without the use of calculus and algebra. For example, both the Egyptians and the Babylonians were aware of versions of the Pythagorean theorem about 1500 years before Pythagoras, and the Indian Sulba Sutras (c. 800–500 BCE) contains the first statements of the theorem; the Egyptians had a correct formula for the volume of a frustum of a square pyramid.

=== Egyptian geometry ===
The ancient Egyptians knew that they could approximate the area of a circle as follows:

Area of Circle ≈ [ (Diameter) × 8/9 ]^{2}.

Problem 50 of the Ahmes papyrus uses these methods to calculate the area of a circle, according to a rule that the area is equal to the square of 8/9 of the circle's diameter. This assumes that π is 4×(8/9)^{2} (or 3.160493...), with an error of slightly over 0.63 percent. This value was slightly less accurate than the calculations of the Babylonians (25/8 = 3.125, within 0.53 percent), but was not otherwise surpassed until Archimedes' approximation of 211875/67441 = 3.14163, which had an error of just over 1 in 10,000.

Ahmes knew of the modern 22/7 as an approximation for π, and used it to split a hekat, hekat x 22/x x 7/22 = hekat; however, Ahmes continued to use the traditional 256/81 value for π for computing his hekat volume found in a cylinder.

Problem 48 involved using a square with side 9 units. This square was cut into a 3x3 grid. The diagonal of the corner squares were used to make an irregular octagon with an area of 63 units. This gave a second value for π of 3.111...

The two problems together indicate a range of values for π between 3.11 and 3.16.

Problem 14 in the Moscow Mathematical Papyrus gives the only ancient example finding the volume of a frustum of a pyramid, describing the correct formula:
$$V = \frac{1}{3} h(a^2 + ab + b^2)$$
where a and b are the base and top side lengths of the truncated pyramid and h is the height.

=== Babylonian geometry ===
The Babylonians may have known the general rules for measuring areas and volumes. They measured the circumference of a circle as three times the diameter and the area as one-twelfth the square of the circumference, which would be correct if π is estimated as 3. The volume of a cylinder was taken as the product of the base and the height, however, the volume of the frustum of a cone or a square pyramid was incorrectly taken as the product of the height and half the sum of the bases. The Pythagorean theorem was also known to the Babylonians. Also, there was a recent discovery in which a tablet used π as 3 and 1/8. The Babylonians are also known for the Babylonian mile, which was a measure of distance equal to about seven miles today. This measurement for distances eventually was converted to a time-mile used for measuring the travel of the Sun, therefore, representing time. There have been recent discoveries showing that ancient Babylonians may have discovered astronomical geometry nearly 1400 years before Europeans did.

=== Vedic India geometry ===
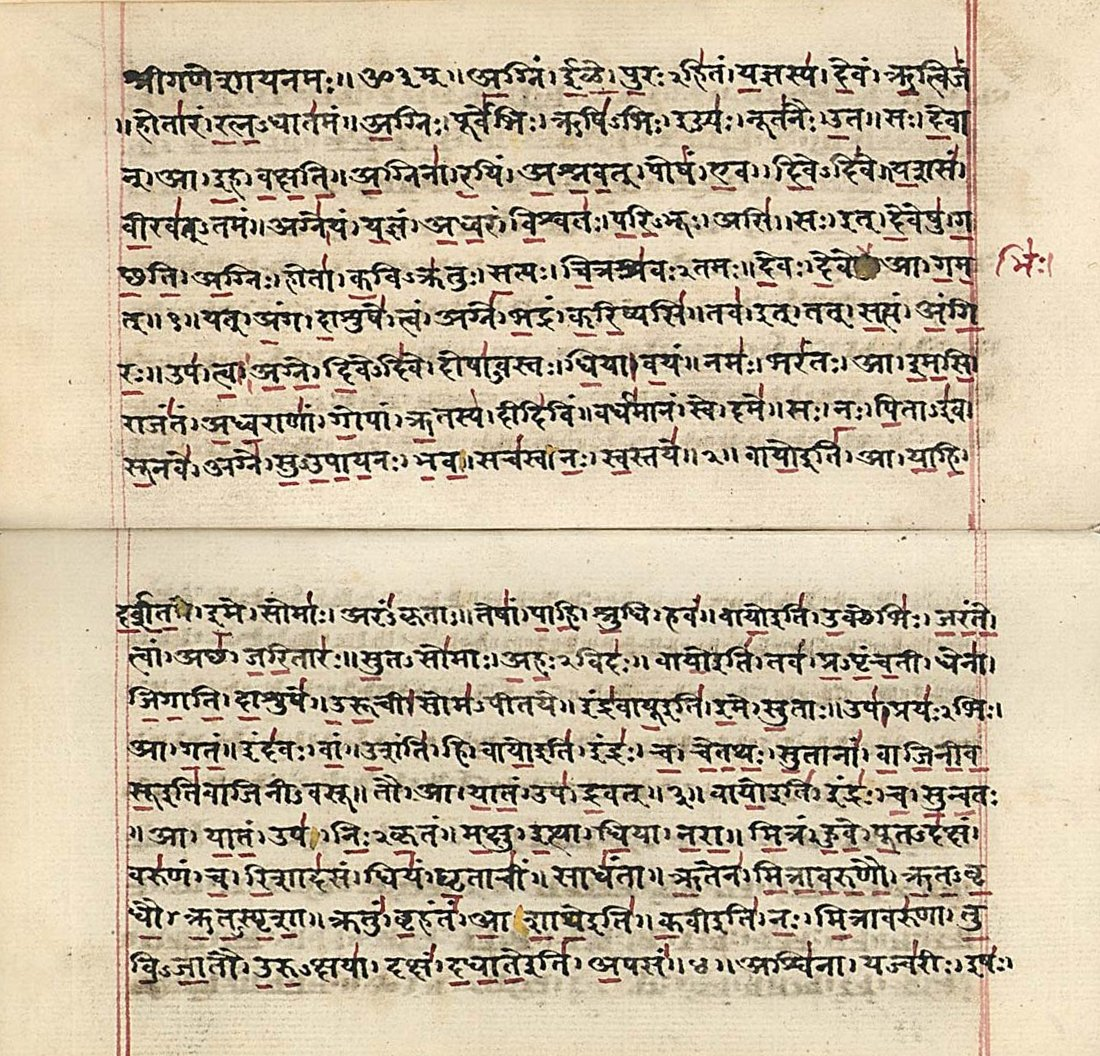
Rigveda manuscript in Devanagari

The Indian Vedic period had a tradition of geometry, mostly expressed in the construction of elaborate altars. Early Indian texts (1st millennium BCE) on this topic include the Satapatha Brahmana and the Śulba Sūtras.

The Śulba Sūtras has been described as "the earliest extant verbal expression of the Pythagorean Theorem in the world, although it had already been known to the Old Babylonians." They make use of Pythagorean triples, which are particular cases of Diophantine equations.

According to mathematician S. G. Dani, the Babylonian cuneiform tablet Plimpton 322 written c. 1850 BCE "contains fifteen Pythagorean triples with quite large entries, including (13500, 12709, 18541) which is a primitive triple, indicating, in particular, that there was sophisticated understanding on the topic" in Mesopotamia in 1850 BCE. "Since these tablets predate the Sulbasutras period by several centuries, taking into account the contextual appearance of some of the triples, it is reasonable to expect that similar understanding would have been there in India." Dani goes on to say:

As the main objective of the Sulvasutras was to describe the constructions of altars and the geometric principles involved in them, the subject of Pythagorean triples, even if it had been well understood may still not have featured in the Sulvasutras. The occurrence of the triples in the Sulvasutras is comparable to mathematics that one may encounter in an introductory book on architecture or another similar applied area, and would not correspond directly to the overall knowledge on the topic at that time. Since, unfortunately, no other contemporaneous sources have been found it may never be possible to settle this issue satisfactorily.

== Greek geometry ==
=== Thales and Pythagoras ===
Pythagorean theorem: a^{2} + b^{2} = c^{2}

Thales (635–543 BCE) of Miletus (now in southwestern Turkey), was the first to whom deduction in mathematics is attributed. There are five geometric propositions for which he wrote deductive proofs, though his proofs have not survived. Pythagoras (582–496 BCE) of Ionia, and later, Italy, then colonized by Greeks, may have been a student of Thales, and traveled to Babylon and Egypt. The theorem that bears his name may not have been his discovery, but he was probably one of the first to give a deductive proof of it. He gathered a group of students around him to study mathematics, music, and philosophy, and together they discovered most of what high school students learn today in their geometry courses. In addition, they made the profound discovery of incommensurable lengths and irrational numbers.

=== Plato ===
Plato (427–347 BCE) was a philosopher, highly esteemed by the Greeks. There is a story that he had inscribed above the entrance to his famous school, "Let none ignorant of geometry enter here." However, the story is considered to be untrue. Though he was not a mathematician himself, his views on mathematics had great influence. Mathematicians thus accepted his belief that geometry should use no tools but compass and straightedge – never measuring instruments such as a marked ruler or a protractor, because these were a workman's tools, not worthy of a scholar. This dictum led to a deep study of possible compass and straightedge constructions, and three classic construction problems: how to use these tools to trisect an angle, to construct a cube twice the volume of a given cube, and to construct a square equal in area to a given circle. The proofs of the impossibility of these constructions, finally achieved in the 19th century, led to important principles regarding the deep structure of the real number system. Aristotle (384–322 BCE), Plato's greatest pupil, wrote a treatise on methods of reasoning used in deductive proofs (see Logic) which was not substantially improved upon until the 19th century.

=== Hellenistic geometry ===
==== Euclid ====
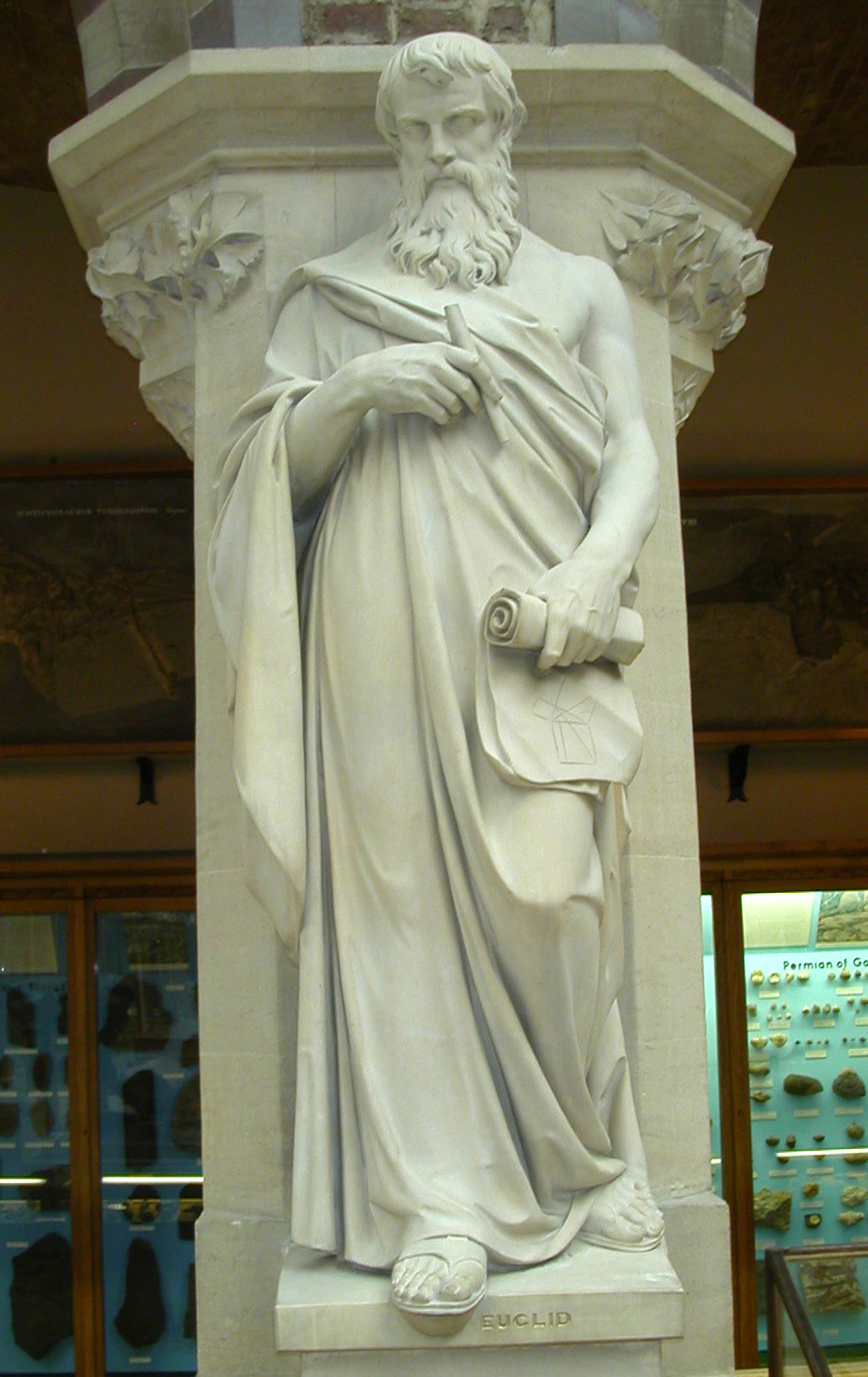
Statue of Euclid in the Oxford University Museum of Natural History

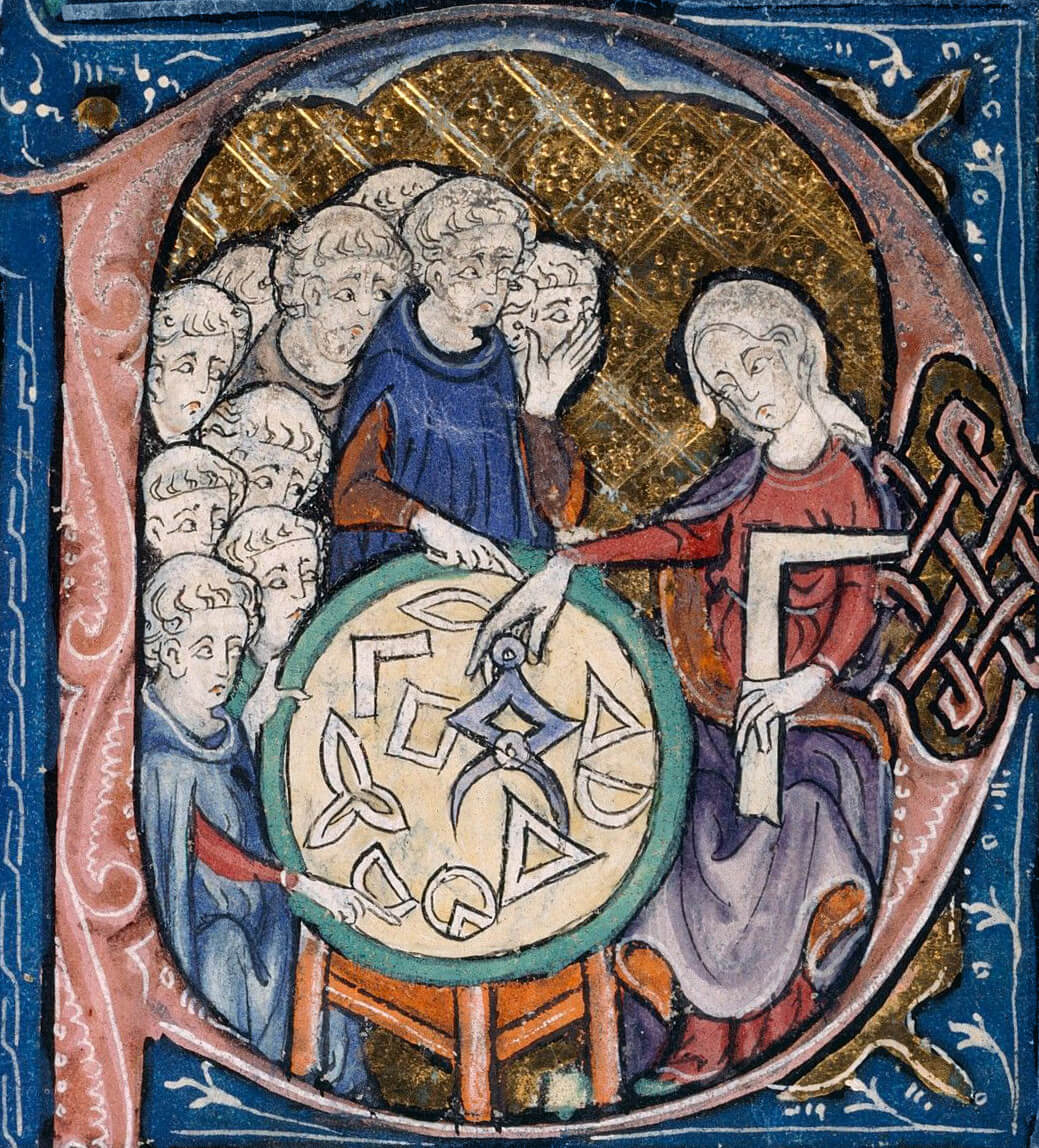
Woman teaching geometry. Illustration at the beginning of a medieval translation of Euclid's Elements (c. 1310)

Euclid (c. 325–265 BCE), of Alexandria, probably a student at the Academy founded by Plato, wrote a treatise in 13 books (chapters), titled The Elements of Geometry, in which he presented geometry in an ideal axiomatic form, which came to be known as Euclidean geometry. The treatise is not a compendium of all that the Hellenistic mathematicians knew at the time about geometry; Euclid himself wrote eight more advanced books on geometry. We know from other references that Euclid's was not the first elementary geometry textbook, but it was so much superior that the others fell into disuse and were lost. He was brought to the university at Alexandria by Ptolemy I, King of Egypt.

The Elements began with definitions of terms, fundamental geometric principles (called axioms or postulates), and general quantitative principles (called common notions) from which all the rest of geometry could be logically deduced. Following are his five axioms, somewhat paraphrased to make the English easier to read.

1. Any two points can be joined by a straight line.
2. Any finite straight line can be extended in a straight line.
3. A circle can be drawn with any center and any radius.
4. All right angles are equal to each other.
5. If two straight lines in a plane are crossed by another straight line (called the transversal), and the interior angles between the two lines and the transversal lying on one side of the transversal add up to less than two right angles, then on that side of the transversal, the two lines extended will intersect (also called the parallel postulate).

Concepts, that are now understood as algebra, were expressed geometrically by Euclid, a method referred to as Greek geometric algebra.

==== Archimedes ====
Archimedes (287–212 BCE), of Syracuse, Sicily, when it was a Greek city-state, was one of the most famous mathematicians of the Hellenistic period. He is known for his formulation of a hydrostatic principle (known as Archimedes' principle) and for his works on geometry, including Measurement of the Circle and On Conoids and Spheroids. His work On Floating Bodies is the first known work on hydrostatics, of which Archimedes is recognized as the founder. Renaissance translations of his works, including the ancient commentaries, were enormously influential in the work of some of the best mathematicians of the 17th century, notably René Descartes and Pierre de Fermat.

==== After Archimedes ====
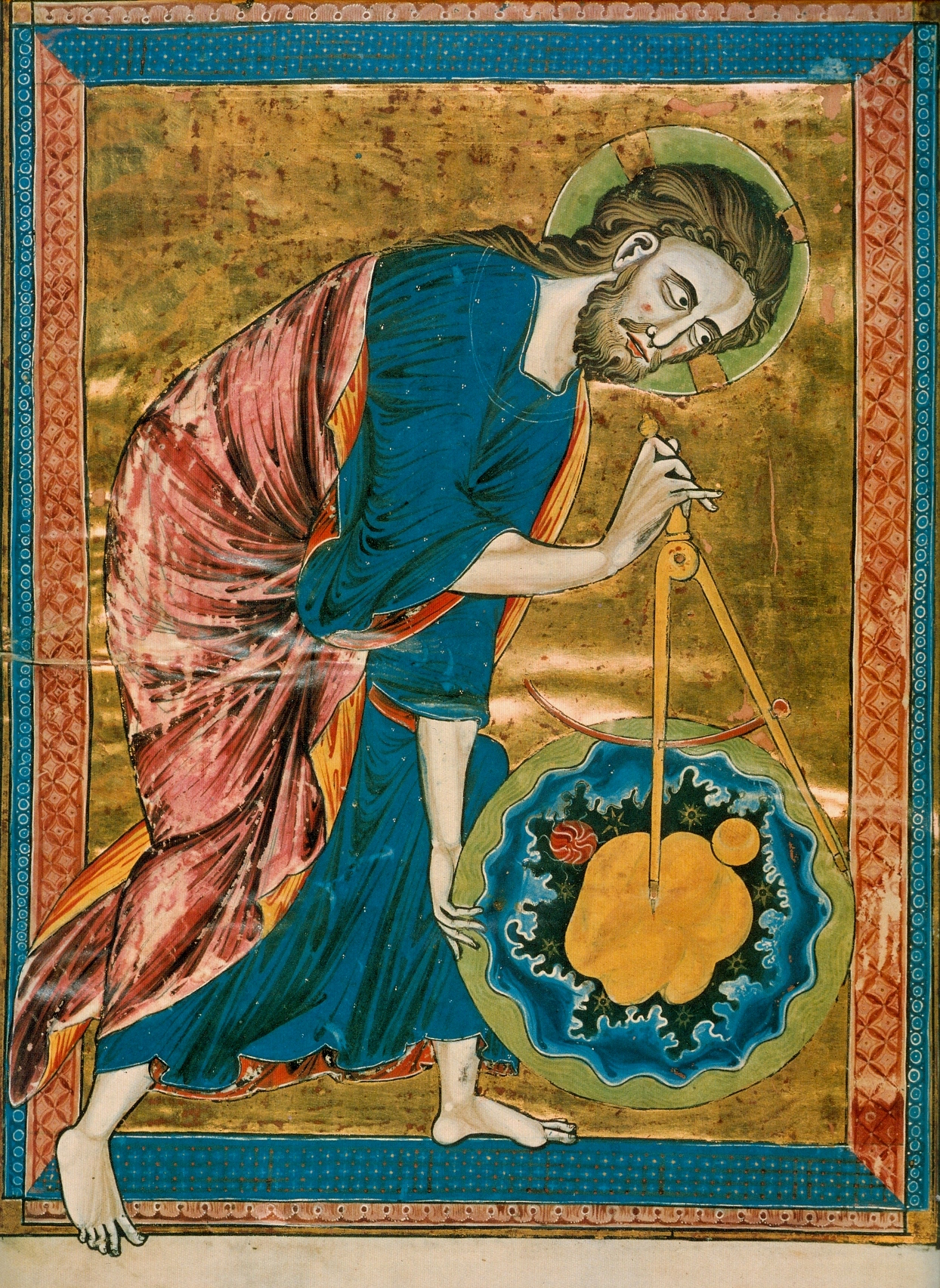
Geometry was connected to the divine for most medieval scholars. The compass in this 13th-century manuscript is a symbol of God's act of Creation.

After Archimedes, Hellenistic mathematics began to decline. There were a few minor stars yet to come, but the golden age of geometry was over. Proclus (410–485), author of Commentary on the First Book of Euclid, was one of the last important players in Hellenistic geometry. He was a competent geometer, but more importantly, he was a superb commentator on the works that preceded him. Much of that work did not survive to modern times, and is known to us only through his commentary. The Roman Republic and Empire that succeeded and absorbed the Greek city-states produced excellent engineers, but no mathematicians of note.

The great Library of Alexandria was later burned. There is a growing consensus among historians that the Library of Alexandria likely suffered from several destructive events, but that the destruction of Alexandria's pagan temples in the late 4th century was probably the most severe and final one. The evidence for that destruction is the most definitive and secure. Caesar's invasion may well have led to the loss of some 40,000–70,000 scrolls in a warehouse adjacent to the port (as Luciano Canfora argues, they were likely copies produced by the Library intended for export), but it is unlikely to have affected the Library or Museum, given that there is ample evidence that both existed later.

Civil wars, decreasing investments in maintenance and acquisition of new scrolls and generally declining interest in non-religious pursuits likely contributed to a reduction in the body of material available in the Library, especially in the 4th century. The Serapeum was certainly destroyed by Theophilus in 391, and the Museum and Library may have fallen victim to the same campaign.

== Classical Indian geometry ==
In the Bakhshali manuscript, there is a handful of geometric problems (including problems about volumes of irregular solids). The Bakhshali manuscript also "employs a decimal place value system with a dot for zero." Aryabhata's Aryabhatiya (499) includes the computation of areas and volumes.

Brahmagupta wrote his astronomical work Brāhma Sphuṭa Siddhānta in 628. Chapter 12, containing 66 Sanskrit verses, was divided into two sections: "basic operations" (including cube roots, fractions, ratio and proportion, and barter) and "practical mathematics" (including mixture, mathematical series, plane figures, stacking bricks, sawing of timber, and piling of grain). In the latter section, he stated his famous theorem on the diagonals of a cyclic quadrilateral:

Brahmagupta's theorem: If a cyclic quadrilateral has diagonals that are perpendicular to each other, then the perpendicular line drawn from the point of intersection of the diagonals to any side of the quadrilateral always bisects the opposite side.

Chapter 12 also included a formula for the area of a cyclic quadrilateral (a generalization of Heron's formula), as well as a complete description of rational triangles (i.e. triangles with rational sides and rational areas).

Brahmagupta's formula: The area, A, of a cyclic quadrilateral with sides of lengths a, b, c, d, respectively, is given by
$$A = \sqrt{(s-a)(s-b)(s-c)(s-d)}$$
where s, the semiperimeter, given by: $s=\frac{a+b+c+d}{2}.$

Brahmagupta's Theorem on rational triangles: A triangle with rational sides $a, b, c$ and rational area is of the form:

$$a = \frac{u^2}{v}+v, \ \ b=\frac{u^2}{w}+w, \ \ c=\frac{u^2}{v}+\frac{u^2}{w} - (v+w)$$
for some rational numbers $u, v,$ and $w$.

Parameshvara Nambudiri was the first mathematician to give a formula for the radius of the circle circumscribing a cyclic quadrilateral. The expression is sometimes attributed to Lhuilier [1782], 350 years later. With the sides of the cyclic quadrilateral being a, b, c, and d, the radius R of the circumscribed circle is:
$$R = \sqrt {\frac{(ab + cd)(ac + bd)(ad + bc)}{(- a + b + c + d)(a - b + c + d)(a + b - c + d)(a + b + c - d)}}.$$

== Chinese geometry ==
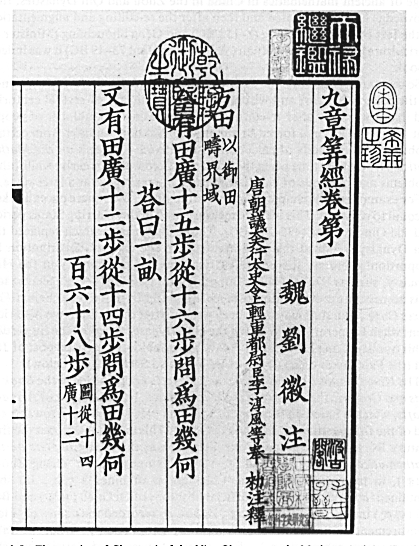
The Nine Chapters on the Mathematical Art, first compiled in 179 AD, with added commentary in the 3rd century by Liu Hui

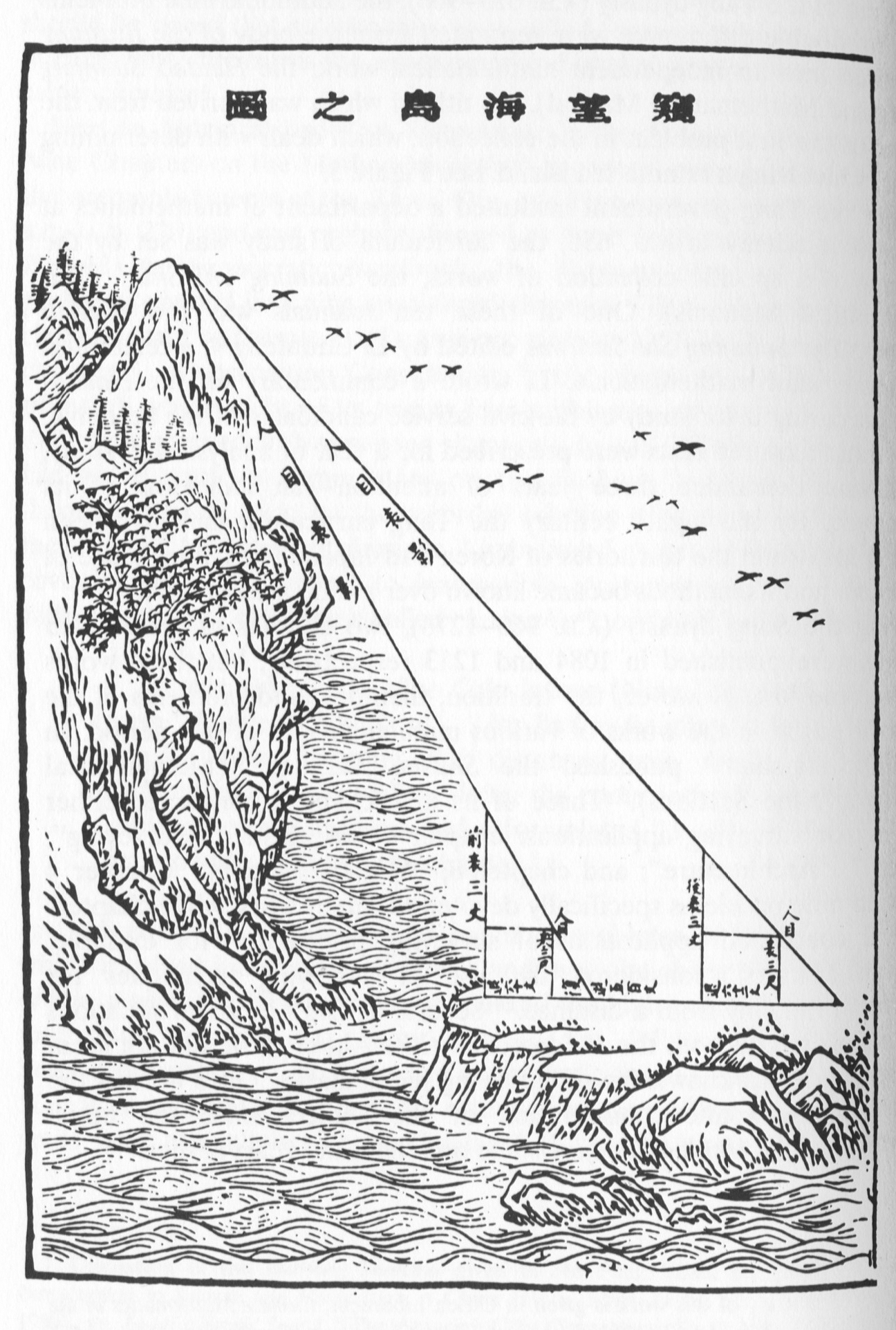
Haidao Suanjing, Liu Hui, 3rd century

The first definitive work (or at least oldest existent) on geometry in China was the Mo Jing, the Mohist canon of the early philosopher Mozi (470–390 BCE). It was compiled years after his death by his followers around the year 330 BCE. Although the Mo Jing is the oldest existent book on geometry in China, there is the possibility that even older written material existed. However, due to the infamous Burning of the Books in a political maneuver by the Qin dynasty ruler Qin Shihuang (r. 221–210 BCE), multitudes of written literature created before his time were purged. In addition, the Mo Jing presents geometrical concepts in mathematics that are perhaps too advanced not to have had a previous geometrical base or mathematic background to work upon.

The Mo Jing described various aspects of many fields associated with physical science, and provided a small wealth of information on mathematics as well. It provided an 'atomic' definition of the geometric point, stating that a line is separated into parts, and the part which has no remaining parts (i.e. cannot be divided into smaller parts) and thus forms the extreme end of a line is a point. Much like Euclid's first and third definitions and Plato's 'beginning of a line', the Mo Jing stated that "a point may stand at the end (of a line) or at its beginning like a head-presentation in childbirth. (As to its invisibility) there is nothing similar to it." Similar to the atomists of Democritus, the Mo Jing stated that a point is the smallest unit, and cannot be cut in half, since 'nothing' cannot be halved. It stated that two lines of equal length will always finish at the same place, while providing definitions for the comparison of lengths and for parallels, along with principles of space and bounded space. It also described the fact that planes without the quality of thickness cannot be piled up since they cannot mutually touch. The book provided definitions for circumference, diameter, and radius, along with the definition of volume.

The Han dynasty (202 BCE – 220 CE) period of China witnessed a new flourishing of mathematics. One of the oldest Chinese mathematical texts to present geometric progressions was the Suàn shù shū of 186 BC, during the Western Han era. The mathematician, inventor, and astronomer Zhang Heng (78–139 CE) used geometrical formulas to solve mathematical problems. Although rough estimates for pi (π) were given in the Zhou Li (compiled in the 2nd century BCE), it was Zhang Heng who was the first to make a concerted effort at creating a more accurate formula for pi. Zhang Heng approximated pi as 730/232 (or approx 3.1466), although he used another formula of pi in finding a spherical volume, using the square root of 10 (or approx 3.162) instead. Zu Chongzhi (429–500 CE) improved the accuracy of the approximation of pi to between 3.1415926 and 3.1415927, with ^{355}/_{113} (密率, Milü, detailed approximation) and ^{22}/_{7} (约率, Yuelü, rough approximation) being the other notable approximation. In comparison to later works, the formula for pi given by the French mathematician Franciscus Vieta (1540–1603) fell halfway between Zu's approximations.

=== The Nine Chapters on the Mathematical Art ===
The Nine Chapters on the Mathematical Art, the title of which first appeared by 179 CE on a bronze inscription, was edited and commented on by the 3rd century mathematician Liu Hui from the Kingdom of Cao Wei. This book included many problems where geometry was applied, such as finding surface areas for squares and circles, the volumes of solids in various three-dimensional shapes, and included the use of the Pythagorean theorem. The book provided illustrated proof for the Pythagorean theorem, contained a written dialogue between of the earlier Duke of Zhou and Shang Gao on the properties of the right angle triangle and the Pythagorean theorem, while also referring to the astronomical gnomon, the circle and square, as well as measurements of heights and distances. The editor Liu Hui listed pi as 3.141014 by using a 192 sided polygon, and then calculated pi as 3.14159 using a 3072 sided polygon. This was more accurate than Liu Hui's contemporary Wang Fan, a mathematician and astronomer from Eastern Wu, would render pi as 3.1555 by using ^{142}/_{45}. Liu Hui also wrote of mathematical surveying to calculate distance measurements of depth, height, width, and surface area. In terms of solid geometry, he figured out that a wedge with rectangular base and both sides sloping could be broken down into a pyramid and a tetrahedral wedge. He also figured out that a wedge with trapezoid base and both sides sloping could be made to give two tetrahedral wedges separated by a pyramid. Furthermore, Liu Hui described Cavalieri's principle on volume, as well as Gaussian elimination. From the Nine Chapters, it listed the following geometrical formulas that were known by the time of the Former Han dynasty (202 BCE – 9 CE).

Areas for the

- Square
- Rectangle
- Circle
- Isosceles triangle
- Rhomboid
- Trapezoid
- Double trapezium
- Segment of a circle
- Annulus ('ring' between two concentric circles)

Volumes for the

- Parallelepiped with two square surfaces
- Parallelepiped with no square surfaces
- Pyramid
- Frustum of pyramid with square base
- Frustum of pyramid with rectangular base of unequal sides
- Cube
- Prism
- Wedge with rectangular base and both sides sloping
- Wedge with trapezoid base and both sides sloping
- Tetrahedral wedge
- Frustum of a wedge of the second type (used for applications in engineering)
- Cylinder
- Cone with circular base
- Frustum of a cone
- Sphere

Continuing the geometrical legacy of ancient China, there were many later figures to come, including the famed astronomer and mathematician Shen Kuo (1031–1095 CE), Yang Hui (1238–1298) who discovered Pascal's Triangle, Xu Guangqi (1562–1633), and many others.

== Islamic Golden Age ==
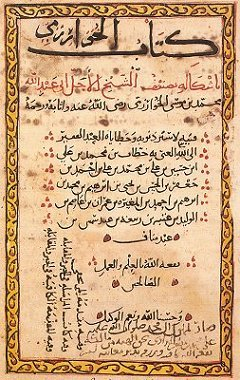
Page from the Al-Jabr wa-al-Muqabilah

Thābit ibn Qurra, using what he called the method of reduction and composition, provided two different general proofs of the Pythagorean theorem for all triangles, before which proofs only existed for the theorem for the special cases of a special right triangle.

A 2007 paper in the journal Science suggested that girih tiles possessed properties consistent with self-similar fractal quasicrystalline tilings such as the Penrose tilings.

== Renaissance ==
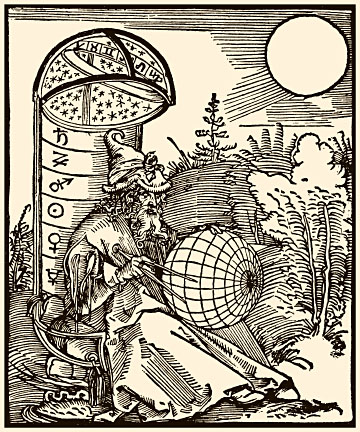
An engraving by Albrecht Dürer featuring Mashallah, from the title page of the De scientia motus orbis (Latin version with engraving, 1504). As in many medieval illustrations, the compass here is an icon of religion as well as science, in reference to God as the architect of creation.

The transmission of the Greek Classics to medieval Europe via the Arabic literature of the 9th to 10th century "Islamic Golden Age" began in the 10th century and culminated in the Latin translations of the 12th century. A copy of Ptolemy's Almagest was brought back to Sicily by Henry Aristippus (d. 1162), as a gift from the Emperor to King William I (r. 1154–1166). An anonymous student at Salerno travelled to Sicily and translated the Almagest as well as several works by Euclid from Greek to Latin. Although the Sicilians generally translated directly from the Greek, when Greek texts were not available, they would translate from Arabic. Eugenius of Palermo (d. 1202) translated Ptolemy's Optics into Latin, drawing on his knowledge of all three languages in the task. The rigorous deductive methods of geometry found in Euclid's Elements of Geometry were relearned, and further development of geometry in the styles of both Euclid (Euclidean geometry) and Khayyam (algebraic geometry) continued, resulting in an abundance of new theorems and concepts, many of them very profound and elegant.

Advances in the treatment of perspective were made in Renaissance art of the 14th to 15th century which went beyond what had been achieved in antiquity. In Renaissance architecture of the Quattrocento, concepts of architectural order were explored and rules were formulated. A prime example of is the Basilica di San Lorenzo in Florence by Filippo Brunelleschi (1377–1446).

In c. 1413 Filippo Brunelleschi demonstrated the geometrical method of perspective, used today by artists, by painting the outlines of various Florentine buildings onto a mirror. Soon after, nearly every artist in Florence and in Italy used geometrical perspective in their paintings, notably Masolino da Panicale and Donatello. Melozzo da Forlì first used the technique of upward foreshortening (in Rome, Loreto, Forlì and others), and was celebrated for that. Not only was perspective a way of showing depth, it was also a new method of composing a painting. Paintings began to show a single, unified scene, rather than a combination of several.

As shown by the quick proliferation of accurate perspective paintings in Florence, Brunelleschi likely understood (with help from his friend the mathematician Toscanelli), but did not publish, the mathematics behind perspective. Decades later, his friend Leon Battista Alberti wrote De pictura (1435/1436), a treatise on proper methods of showing distance in painting based on Euclidean geometry. Alberti was also trained in the science of optics through the school of Padua and under the influence of Biagio Pelacani da Parma who studied Alhazen's Optics.

Piero della Francesca elaborated on Della Pittura in his De Prospectiva Pingendi in the 1470s. Alberti had limited himself to figures on the ground plane and giving an overall basis for perspective. Della Francesca fleshed it out, explicitly covering solids in any area of the picture plane. Della Francesca also started the now common practice of using illustrated figures to explain the mathematical concepts, making his treatise easier to understand than Alberti's. Della Francesca was also the first to accurately draw the Platonic solids as they would appear in perspective.

Perspective remained, for a while, the domain of Florence. Jan van Eyck, among others, was unable to create a consistent structure for the converging lines in paintings, as in London's The Arnolfini Portrait, because he was unaware of the theoretical breakthrough just then occurring in Italy. However he achieved very subtle effects by manipulations of scale in his interiors. Gradually, and partly through the movement of academies of the arts, the Italian techniques became part of the training of artists across Europe, and later other parts of the world. The culmination of these Renaissance traditions finds its ultimate synthesis in the research of the architect, geometer, and optician Girard Desargues on perspective, optics and projective geometry.

The Vitruvian Man by Leonardo da Vinci (c. 1490) depicts a man in two superimposed positions with his arms and legs apart and inscribed in a circle and square. The drawing is based on the correlations of ideal human proportions with geometry described by the ancient Roman architect Vitruvius in Book III of his treatise De Architectura.

== Modern geometry ==
=== The 17th century ===
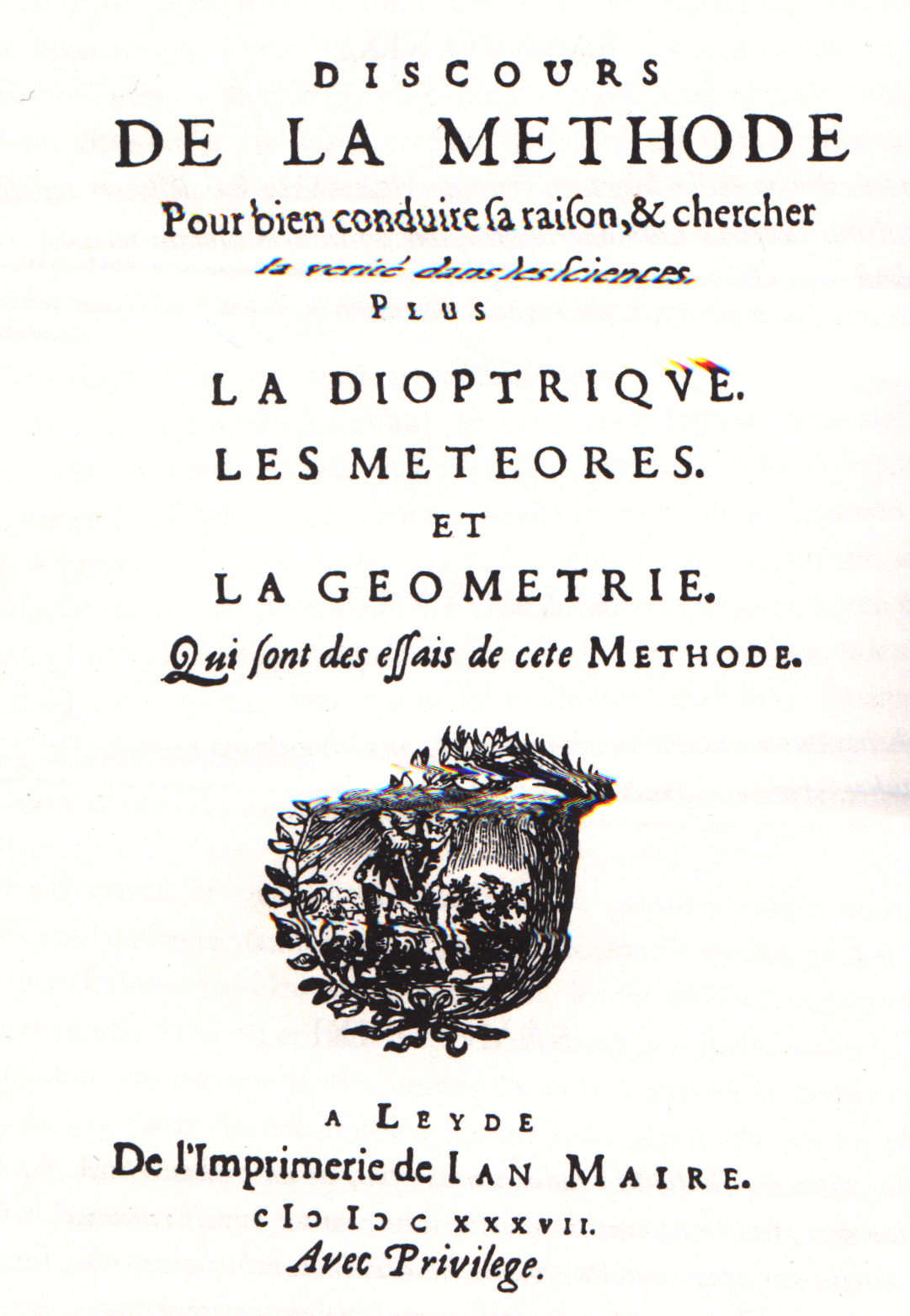
Discourse on Method by René Descartes

In the early 17th century, there were two important developments in geometry. The first and most important was the creation of analytic geometry, or geometry with coordinates and equations, by René Descartes (1596–1650) and Pierre de Fermat (1601–1665). This was a necessary precursor to the development of calculus and a precise quantitative science of physics. The second geometric development of this period was the systematic study of projective geometry by Girard Desargues (1591–1661). Projective geometry is the study of geometry without measurement, just the study of how points align with each other. There had been some early work in this area by Hellenistic geometers, notably Pappus (c. 340). The greatest flowering of the field occurred with Jean-Victor Poncelet (1788–1867).

In the late 17th century, calculus was developed independently and almost simultaneously by Isaac Newton (1642–1727) and Gottfried Wilhelm Leibniz (1646–1716). This was the beginning of a new field of mathematics now called analysis. Though not itself a branch of geometry, it is applicable to geometry, and it solved two families of problems that had long been almost intractable: finding tangent lines to odd curves, and finding areas enclosed by those curves. The methods of calculus reduced these problems mostly to straightforward matters of computation.

=== The 18th and 19th centuries ===
==== Non-Euclidean geometry ====
The very old problem of proving Euclid's Fifth Postulate, the "Parallel Postulate", from his first four postulates had never been forgotten. Beginning not long after Euclid, many attempted demonstrations were given, but all were later found to be faulty, through allowing into the reasoning some principle which itself had not been proved from the first four postulates. Though Omar Khayyám was also unsuccessful in proving the parallel postulate, his criticisms of Euclid's theories of parallels and his proof of properties of figures in non-Euclidean geometries contributed to the eventual development of non-Euclidean geometry. By 1700 a great deal had been discovered about what can be proved from the first four, and what the pitfalls were in attempting to prove the fifth. Saccheri, Lambert, and Legendre each did excellent work on the problem in the 18th century, but still fell short of success. In the early 19th century, Gauss, Johann Bolyai, and Lobachevsky, each independently, took a different approach. Beginning to suspect that it was impossible to prove the Parallel Postulate, they set out to develop a self-consistent geometry in which that postulate was false. In this they were successful, thus creating the first non-Euclidean geometry. By 1854, Bernhard Riemann, a student of Gauss, had applied methods of calculus in a ground-breaking study of the intrinsic (self-contained) geometry of all smooth surfaces, and thereby found a different non-Euclidean geometry. This work of Riemann later became fundamental for Einstein's theory of relativity.

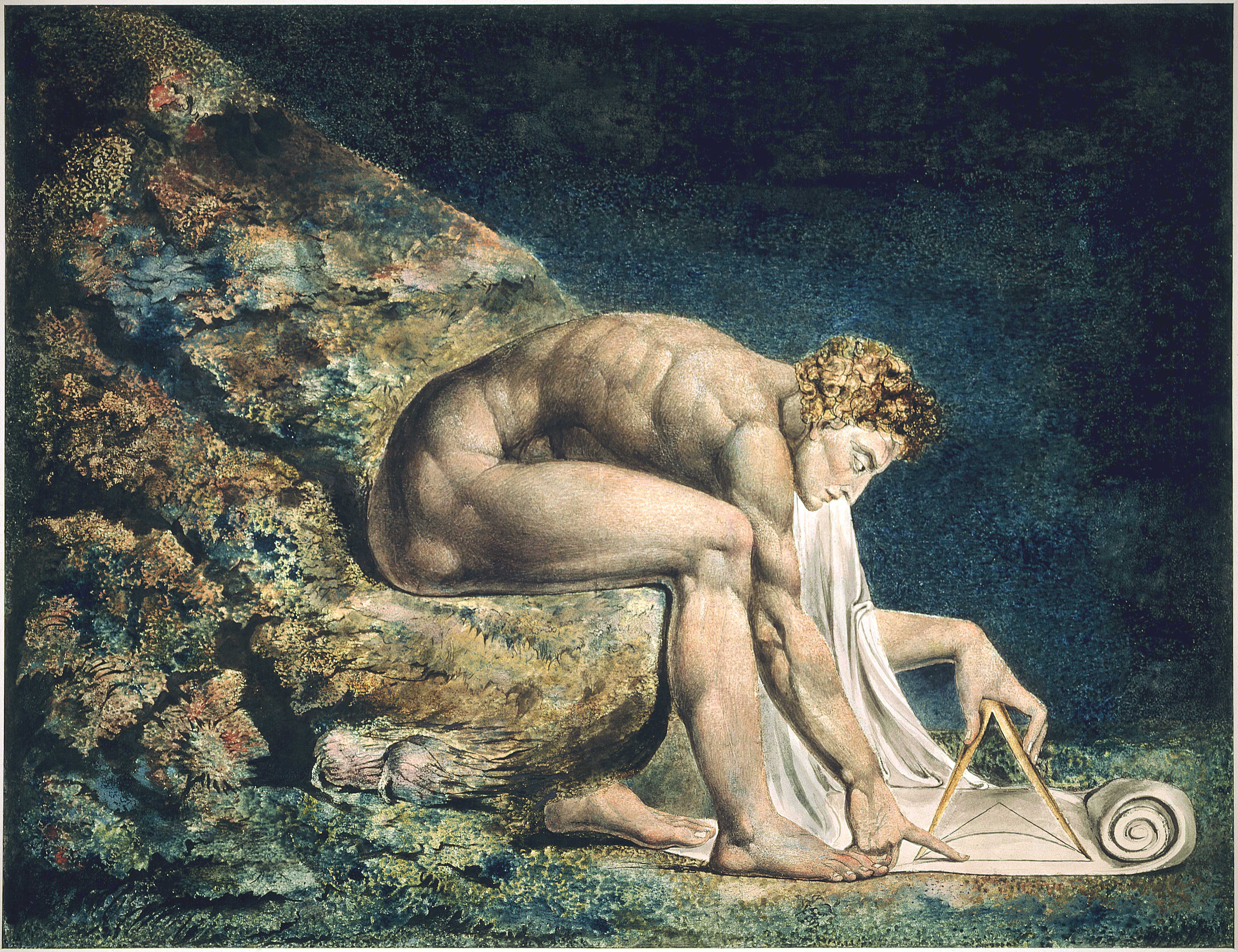
William Blake's "Newton" is a demonstration of his opposition to the 'single-vision' of scientific materialism; here, Isaac Newton is shown as 'divine geometer' (1795).

It remained to be proved mathematically that the non-Euclidean geometry was just as self-consistent as Euclidean geometry, and this was first accomplished by Beltrami in 1868. With this, non-Euclidean geometry was established on an equal mathematical footing with Euclidean geometry.

While it was now known that different geometric theories were mathematically possible, the question remained, "Which one of these theories is correct for our physical space?" The mathematical work revealed that this question must be answered by physical experimentation, not mathematical reasoning, and uncovered the reason why the experimentation must involve immense (interstellar, not earth-bound) distances. With the development of relativity theory in physics, this question became vastly more complicated.

==== Introduction of mathematical rigor ====
All the work related to the Parallel Postulate revealed that it was quite difficult for a geometer to separate his logical reasoning from his intuitive understanding of physical space, and, moreover, revealed the critical importance of doing so. Careful examination had uncovered some logical inadequacies in Euclid's reasoning, and some unstated geometric principles to which Euclid sometimes appealed. This critique paralleled the crisis occurring in calculus and analysis regarding the meaning of infinite processes such as convergence and continuity. In geometry, there was a clear need for a new set of axioms, which would be complete, and which in no way relied on pictures we draw or on our intuition of space. Such axioms, now known as Hilbert's axioms, were given by David Hilbert in 1894 in his dissertation Grundlagen der Geometrie (Foundations of Geometry).

==== Analysis situs, or topology ====
In the mid-18th century, it became apparent that certain progressions of mathematical reasoning recurred when similar ideas were studied on the number line, in two dimensions, and in three dimensions. Thus the general concept of a metric space was created so that the reasoning could be done in more generality, and then applied to special cases. This method of studying calculus- and analysis-related concepts came to be known as analysis situs, and later as topology. The important topics in this field were properties of more general figures, such as connectedness and boundaries, rather than properties like straightness, and precise equality of length and angle measurements, which had been the focus of Euclidean and non-Euclidean geometry. Topology soon became a separate field of major importance, rather than a sub-field of geometry or analysis.

==== Geometry of more than 3 dimensions ====
The 19th century saw the development of the general concept of Euclidean space by Ludwig Schläfli, who extended Euclidean geometry beyond three dimensions. He discovered all the higher-dimensional analogues of the Platonic solids, finding that there are exactly six such regular convex polytopes in dimension four, and three in all higher dimensions.

In 1878 William Kingdon Clifford introduced what is now termed geometric algebra, unifying William Rowan Hamilton's quaternions with Hermann Grassmann's algebra and revealing the geometric nature of these systems, especially in four dimensions. The operations of geometric algebra have the effect of mirroring, rotating, translating, and mapping the geometric objects that are being modeled to new positions.

=== The 20th century ===
Developments in algebraic geometry included the study of curves and surfaces over finite fields as demonstrated by the works of among others André Weil, Alexander Grothendieck, and Jean-Pierre Serre as well as over the real or complex numbers. Finite geometry itself, the study of spaces with only finitely many points, found applications in coding theory and cryptography. With the advent of the computer, new disciplines such as computational geometry or digital geometry deal with geometric algorithms, discrete representations of geometric data, and so forth.

== See also ==
- Flatland, a book by "A. Square" about two– and three-dimensional space, to understand the concept of four dimensions
- Timeline of geometry – Notable events in the history of geometry
- History of Euclidean geometry
- History of non-Euclidean geometry
- History of mathematics
- History of measurement
- History of space (mathematics)
- Important publications in geometry
- Interactive geometry software
- List of geometry topics
- Modern triangle geometry
