= Pierre Alphonse Laurent =

French mathematician (1813–1854)

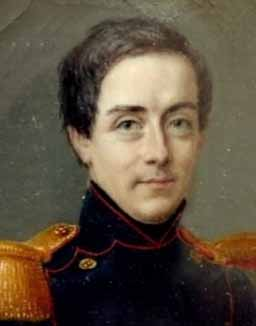
- Born: 18 July 1813; Paris, France
- Died: 2 September 1854 (aged 41); Paris, France
- Education: École Polytechnique
- Known for: Laurent series
- Scientific career
- Fields: Mathematics

Pierre Alphonse Laurent (18 July 1813 – 2 September 1854) was a French mathematician, engineer, and Military Officer best known for discovering the Laurent series, an expansion of a function into an infinite power series, generalizing the Taylor series expansion.

== Life ==
He was born in Paris, France. His father, Pierre Michel Laurent (1769 – 1841) was French, whereas his mother, Eleanor Cheshire (1778 – 1840) was English. Pierre Laurent entered the École Polytechnique in Paris in 1830 and graduated in 1832 as one of the best students in his year. Afterwards, he joined the engineering corps as a second lieutenant, before attending the École d'Application at Metz until he was sent to Algeria.

Laurent returned to France from Algeria around 1840 and spent six years directing operations for the enlargement of the port of Le Havre on the English Channel coast. Rouen had been the main French port up to the nineteenth century, but the hydraulic construction projects on which Laurent worked in Le Havre turned it into France's main seaport. It is clear that Laurent was a good engineer, putting his deep theoretical knowledge to good practical use.

=== Mathematics ===
It was while Laurent was working on the construction project at Le Havre that he began to write his first mathematical papers. He submitted a memoir for the Grand Prize of the Académie des Sciences of 1842. His result was contained in a memoir submitted for the Grand Prize of the Académie des Sciences in 1843, but his submission was after the due date, and the paper was not published and never considered for the prize. Laurent died at age 41 in Paris. His work was not published until after his death. Possibly the result was first discovered by Karl Weierstrass in an 1841 paper, but not published at the time.

== See also ==
- Laurent polynomial
