= Abu Nasr Mansur =

Persian mathematician and astronomer (c. 960 – 1036)

Abū Naṣr Manṣūr
- Born: c. 960; Gīlān
- Died: 1036; Ghazni
- Known for: Trigonometry, Law of sines
- Scientific career
- Fields: Astronomer, Mathematician

Abū Naṣr Manṣūr ibn ʿAlī ibn ʿIrāq al-Jaʿdī (Persian: ابونصر منصور بن علی بن عراق جیلانی; c. 960 – 1036) was a Persian Muslim mathematician and astronomer. He is well known for his work with the spherical sine law.

Abu Nasri Mansur was born in Gilan, Persia, to the ruling family of Khwarezm, the Afrighids. He was thus a prince within the political sphere. He was a student of Abu'l-Wafa and a teacher of and also an important colleague of the mathematician, Al-Biruni. Together, they were responsible for great discoveries in mathematics and dedicated many works to one another.

Most of Abu Nasri's work focused on mathematics, but some of his writings were on astronomy. In mathematics, he had many important writings on trigonometry, which were developed from the writings of Ptolemy. He also preserved the writings of Menelaus of Alexandria and reworked many of the Greeks theorems.

He died in the Ghaznavid Empire (modern-day Afghanistan) near the city of Ghazna.
