= John Nourse =

English bookseller and book publisher

- Born: 8 July 1705; Oxford
- Died: 24 April 1780 (aged 74); London

John Nourse (baptised 8 July 1705 in Oxford – 24 April 1780 in London) was an English bookseller and book publisher noted for his publication of scientific books. He had dealings with a number of notable people including Montesquieu, Voltaire Benjamin Franklin.

== Education ==
He was the son of a surgeon and was educated at John Roysse's Free School, in Abingdon (now Abingdon School). He later became a Steward of the OA Club in 1747.

== Career ==
Nourse became apprenticed to William Mears as a bookseller and to John Osborne in 1722. His brother, the surgeon Charles Nourse took over the business when he died. Later on, Francis Wingrave Succedded him. His premises were at the Old King's Arms opposite Catherine Street on the Strand, London.

He was licensed to publish the first Nautical Almanac and Astronomical Ephemeris, dated 1766, but actually appearing in 1767, as evinced by correspondence between Nevil Maskelyne and Nourse. He exported English books throughout the Continent and translated editions of Continental Enlightenment writers. He published more than four hundred editions. His shop became a salon and a space for philosophical and scientific debate.

He died in Kensington and was buried at the University Church of St Mary the Virgin, Oxford on 2 May 1780. His will is in The National Archives, Kew.

== See also ==
- List of Old Abingdonians
