= De Moivre's theorem =

de Moivre's theorem may be:

- de Moivre's formula, a trigonometric identity
- Theorem of de Moivre–Laplace, a central limit theorem
