= Polar coordinate system =

Coordinates comprising a distance and an angle

Points in the polar coordinate system with pole O and polar axis L. In green, the point with radial coordinate 3 and angular coordinate 60 degrees or (3, 60°). In blue, the point (4, 210°).

In mathematics, the polar coordinate system specifies a given point in a plane by using a distance and an angle as its two coordinates. These are

- the point's distance from a reference point called the pole, and
- the point's direction from the pole relative to the direction of the polar axis, a ray drawn from the pole.

The distance from the pole is called the radial coordinate, radial distance or simply radius, and the angle is called the angular coordinate, polar angle, or azimuth. The pole is analogous to the origin in a Cartesian coordinate system.

Polar coordinates are most appropriate in any context where the phenomenon being considered is inherently tied to direction and length from a center point in a plane, such as spirals. Planar physical systems with bodies moving around a central point, or phenomena originating from a central point, are often simpler and more intuitive to model using polar coordinates.

The polar coordinate system is extended to three dimensions in two ways: the cylindrical coordinate system adds a second distance coordinate, and the spherical coordinate system adds a second angular coordinate.

Grégoire de Saint-Vincent and Bonaventura Cavalieri independently introduced the system's concepts in the mid-17th century, though the actual term polar coordinates has been attributed to Gregorio Fontana in the 18th century. The initial motivation for introducing the polar system was the study of circular and orbital motion.

== History ==
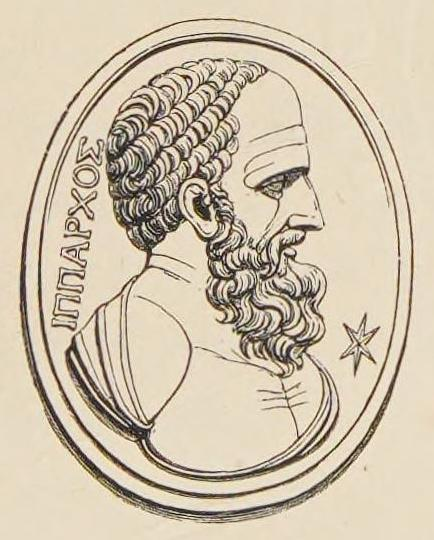
Hipparchus, Greek astronomer

The concepts of angle and radius were already used by ancient peoples of the first millennium BC. The Greek astronomer Hipparchus (190–120 BC) created a table of chord functions giving the length of the chord for each angle, and there are references to his using polar coordinates in establishing stellar positions. In On Spirals, Greek mathematician Archimedes describes his spiral, a function whose radius depends on the angle. The Greek work, however, did not extend to a full coordinate system.

From the 8th century AD onward, Arab astronomers developed methods for approximating and calculating the direction to Mecca (qibla)—and its distance—from any location on the Earth. From the 9th century onward they were using spherical trigonometry and map projection methods to determine these quantities accurately. The calculation is essentially the conversion of the equatorial polar coordinates of Mecca (i.e. its longitude and latitude) to its polar coordinates (i.e. its qibla and distance) relative to a system whose reference meridian is the great circle through the given location and the Earth's poles and whose polar axis is the line through the location and its antipodal point.

There are various accounts of the introduction of polar coordinates as part of a formal coordinate system. The full history of the subject is described in Harvard professor Julian Lowell Coolidge's Origin of Polar Coordinates. Mathematicians from Jesuit, Grégoire de Saint-Vincent, and Italian Bonaventura Cavalieri independently introduced the concepts in the mid-seventeenth century. Saint-Vincent wrote about them privately in 1625 and published his work in 1647, while Cavalieri published his in 1635, with a corrected version appearing in 1653. Cavalieri first used polar coordinates to solve a problem relating to the area within an Archimedean spiral. French mathematician Blaise Pascal subsequently used polar coordinates to calculate the length of parabolic arcs.

In Method of Fluxions (written 1671, published 1736), English mathematician Sir Isaac Newton examined the transformations between polar coordinates, which he referred to as the "Seventh Manner; For Spirals", and nine other coordinate systems. He is credited with originating the polar coordinate system in its analytic form and for originating bipolar coordinates in a strict sense. In the journal Acta Eruditorum (1691), Swiss mathematician Jacob Bernoulli used a system with a point on a line, called the pole and polar axis respectively. Coordinates were specified by the distance from the pole and the angle from the polar axis. Bernoulli's work extended to the calculation of the radius of curvature of curves expressed in these coordinates.

The term polar coordinates was attributed to Gregorio Fontana and used by 18th-century Italian writers. The term appeared in English in George Peacock's 1816 translation of Lacroix's Differential and Integral Calculus. Alexis Clairaut was the first to think of polar coordinates in three dimensions, and Leonhard Euler was the first to actually develop them.

== Conventions ==
A polar grid with several angles, increasing in counterclockwise orientation and labelled in degrees

The radial coordinate is often denoted by $r$ or $\rho$ (rho). The angular coordinate is denoted by $\varphi$ (phi), specified by ISO standard 31-11 (now 80000-2:2019), or $\theta$ (theta) in mathematical literature oftentimes.

Angles in polar notation are generally expressed in either degrees or radians (2π rad being equal to 360°). Degrees are traditionally used in navigation, surveying, and many applied disciplines, while radians are more common in mathematics and mathematical physics.

The angle $\varphi$ is defined to start at 0° from a reference direction, and to increase for rotations in either clockwise (↻) or counterclockwise (↺) orientation. For example, in mathematics, the reference direction is usually drawn as a ray from the pole horizontally to the right, and the polar angle increases to positive angles for ccw rotations, whereas in navigation (bearing, heading) the 0°-heading is drawn vertically upwards and the angle increases for cw rotations. The polar angles decrease towards negative values for rotations in the respective opposite orientations.

=== Uniqueness of polar coordinates ===
Adding any number of full turns (360°) to the angular coordinate does not change the corresponding direction. Similarly, any polar coordinate is identical to the coordinate with the negative radial component and the opposite direction (adding 180° to the polar angle). Therefore, the same point $(r,\varphi)$ can be expressed with an infinite number of different polar coordinates $(r,\varphi + n \times 360^\circ)$ and $(-r, \varphi + 180^\circ + n \times 360^\circ) = (-r, \varphi + (2n+1) \times 180^\circ)$, where $n$ is an arbitrary integer. Moreover, the pole itself can be expressed as $(0, \varphi)$ for any angle $\varphi$.

Where a unique representation is needed for any point besides the pole, it is usual to limit $r$ to positive numbers ($r > 0$) and $\varphi$ to either the interval $[0,360^\circ)$ or the interval $(-180^\circ, 180^\circ]$, which in radians are $[0,2\pi)$ or $(-\pi,\pi]$. Another convention, in reference to the usual codomain of the arctan function, is to allow for arbitrary nonzero real values of the radial component and restrict the polar angle to $(-90^\circ, 90^\circ]$. In all cases, a unique azimuth for the pole $r = 0$ must be chosen, e.g., $\varphi = 0$.

== Converting between polar and Cartesian coordinates ==
A diagram illustrating the relationship between polar and Cartesian coordinates.

The polar coordinates $r$ and $\varphi$ can be converted to the Cartesian coordinates $x$ and $y$ by using the trigonometric functions of sine and cosine, respectively:

$$\begin{align}
x &= r \cos \varphi, \\
y &= r \sin \varphi.
\end{align}$$

The Cartesian coordinates $x$ and $y$ can be converted to polar coordinates $r$ and $\varphi$, with $r \ge 0$ and $\varphi$ in the interval $(-\pi,\pi]$ by:
$$\begin{align}
r &= \sqrt{x^2 + y^2} \\
\varphi &= \operatorname{atan2}(y, x),
\end{align}$$
where atan2 is a common variation on the arctangent function defined as
$$\operatorname{atan2}(y, x) = \begin{cases}
\arctan\left(\frac{y}{x}\right)       & \mbox{if } x > 0\\
\arctan\left(\frac{y}{x}\right) + \pi & \mbox{if } x < 0 \mbox{ and } y \ge 0\\
\arctan\left(\frac{y}{x}\right) - \pi & \mbox{if } x < 0 \mbox{ and } y < 0\\
\frac{\pi}{2}                         & \mbox{if } x = 0 \mbox{ and } y > 0\\
-\frac{\pi}{2}                         & \mbox{if } x = 0 \mbox{ and } y < 0\\
\text{undefined}                      & \mbox{if } x = 0 \mbox{ and } y = 0.
\end{cases}$$

If r is calculated first as above, then this formula for φ may be stated more simply using the arccosine function:
$$\varphi = \begin{cases}
\arccos\left(\frac{x}{r}\right) & \mbox{if } y \ge 0 \mbox{ and } r \neq 0 \\
-\arccos\left(\frac{x}{r}\right) & \mbox{if } y < 0 \\
\text{undefined}                & \mbox{if } r = 0.
\end{cases}$$

=== Complex numbers ===
An illustration of a complex number z plotted on the complex plane

An illustration of a complex number plotted on the complex plane using Euler's formula

A complex number consists of real numbers $x$ and $y$, as well as an imaginary number $i^2 = -1$, which can be written as $z = x + iy$. Every complex number represents a point in the complex plane, thereby expressible by specifying either the point's Cartesian coordinates (called rectangular or Cartesian form) or the point's polar coordinates (called polar form).

In polar form, the distance $r$ and angle coordinate $\varphi$ are often referred to as the number's magnitude of modulus and argument, respectively. This can be obtained from a complex number $z = x + iy$, represented in rectangular form as, into a polar form, by substituting $x = r \cos \varphi$ and $y = r \sin \varphi$:
$$z = r(\cos\varphi + i\sin\varphi) = re^{i\varphi}.$$
The last expression is derived from Euler's formula, where $e$ is Euler's number approximately 2.718, and $\varphi$—expressed in radians—is the principal value of the complex number function arg applied to $z = x + iy$. To convert between the rectangular and polar forms of a complex number, the conversion formulae given above can be used. Equivalent are the cis—a function denotes $\cos \varphi + i \sin \varphi$—and angle notations:
$$z = r \operatorname\mathrm{cis} \varphi = r \angle \varphi .$$

For the operations of multiplication, division, exponentiation, and root extraction of complex numbers, it is generally much simpler to work with complex numbers expressed in polar form rather than rectangular form. From the laws of exponentiation:

- Multiplication: $r_0 e^{i\varphi_0}\, r_1 e^{i\varphi_1} = r_0 r_1 e^{i\left(\varphi_0 + \varphi_1\right)}$
- Division: $\frac{r_0 e^{i\varphi_0}}{r_1 e^{i\varphi_1}} = \frac{r_0}{r_1}e^{i(\varphi_0 - \varphi_1)}$
- Exponentiation or de Moivre's formula: $\left(re^{i\varphi}\right)^n = r^n e^{in\varphi}$
- Root Extraction or principal root: $\sqrt[n]{re^{i\varphi}} = \sqrt[n]{r} e^{i\varphi \over n}$

== Polar equation of a curve ==
A curve on the Cartesian plane can be mapped into polar coordinates. In this animation, $y = \sin (6\!\cdot\!x) + 2$ is mapped onto $r = \sin (6\!\cdot\!\theta) + 2$. Click on image for details.

The equation defining a plane curve expressed in polar coordinates is known as a polar equation. In many cases, such an equation can simply be specified by defining r as a function of φ. The resulting curve then consists of points of the form (r(φ), φ) and can be regarded as the graph of the polar function r. Note that, in contrast to Cartesian coordinates, the independent variable φ is the second entry in the ordered pair.

Different forms of symmetry can be deduced from the equation of a polar function r:

- If r(−φ) = r(φ) the curve will be symmetrical about the horizontal (0°/180°) ray;
- If r(π − φ) = r(φ) it will be symmetric about the vertical (90°/270°) ray:
- If r(φ − α) = r(φ) it will be rotationally symmetric by α clockwise and counterclockwise about the pole.

Because of the circular nature of the polar coordinate system, many curves can be described by a rather simple polar equation, whereas their Cartesian form is much more intricate. Among the best known of these curves are the polar rose, Archimedean spiral, lemniscate, limaçon, and cardioid.

For the circle, line, and polar rose below, it is understood that there are no restrictions on the domain and range of the curve.

=== Circle ===
A circle with equation r(φ) = 1

The general equation for a circle with a center at $(r_0, \gamma)$ and radius a is
$$r^2 - 2 r r_0 \cos(\varphi - \gamma) + r_0^2 = a^2.$$

This can be simplified in various ways, to conform to more specific cases, such as the equation
$$r(\varphi)=a$$
for a circle with a center at the pole and radius a.

When r_{0} = a or the origin lies on the circle, the equation becomes
$$r = 2 a\cos(\varphi - \gamma).$$

In the general case, the equation can be solved for r, giving
$$r = r_0 \cos(\varphi - \gamma) + \sqrt{a^2 - r_0^2 \sin^2(\varphi - \gamma)}$$
The solution with a minus sign in front of the square root gives the same curve.

=== Conic sections ===
Ellipse, showing semi-latus rectum

A conic section with one focus on the pole and the other somewhere on the 0° ray (so that the conic's major axis lies along the polar axis) is given by:
$$r = { \ell\over {1 - \epsilon \cos \varphi}}$$
where $\epsilon$ is the eccentricity and $\ell$ is the semi-latus rectum (the perpendicular distance at a focus from the major axis to the curve). If $\epsilon > 1$, this equation defines a hyperbola; if $\epsilon = 1$, it defines a parabola; and if $\epsilon < 1$, it defines an ellipse. The special case $\epsilon = 0$ of the latter results in a circle of the radius $\ell$.

=== Line ===
Radial lines (those running through the pole) are represented by the equation
$$\varphi = \gamma,$$
where $\gamma$ is the angle of elevation of the line; that is, $\varphi = \arctan m$, where $m$ is the slope of the line in the Cartesian coordinate system. The non-radial line that crosses the radial line $\varphi = \gamma$ perpendicularly at the point $(r_0, \gamma)$ has the equation
$$r(\varphi) = r_0 \sec(\varphi - \gamma).$$

Otherwise stated $(r_0, \gamma)$ is the point in which the tangent intersects the imaginary circle of radius $r_0$

=== Polar rose ===
A polar rose with equation r(φ) = 2 sin 4φ

A polar rose is a mathematical curve that looks like a petaled flower, and that can be expressed as one of two distinct polar equations:
$$\begin{align}
r(\varphi) &= a\sin\left(k\varphi\right), \\
r(\varphi) &= a\cos\left(k\varphi\right).
\end{align}$$
The cosine and sine forms are not equivalent, but the difference is only a rotation of the resulting curve. Both are special cases of r(φ) = a cos(kφ + γ), with γ determining the phase and equivalently the rotation. If k is an integer, these equations will produce a k-petaled rose if k is odd, or a 2k-petaled rose if k is even. If k is rational, but not an integer, a rose-like shape may form, but with overlapping petals. Note that these equations never define a rose with 2, 6, 10, 14, etc. petals. The variable a directly represents the length or amplitude of the petals of the rose, while k relates to their spatial frequency.

=== Archimedean spiral ===
One arm of an Archimedean spiral with equation r(φ) = φ / 2π for 0 < φ < 6π

The Archimedean spiral is a spiral discovered by Archimedes, which can also be expressed as a simple polar equation. It is represented by the equation
$$r(\varphi) = a + b\varphi.$$
Changing the parameter a will turn the spiral, while b controls the distance between the arms, which for a given spiral is always constant. The Archimedean spiral has two arms, one for φ > 0 and one for φ < 0. The two arms are smoothly connected at the pole. If a = 0, taking the mirror image of one arm across the 90°/270° line will yield the other arm. This curve is notable as one of the first curves, after the conic sections, to be described in a mathematical treatise, and as a prime example of a curve best defined by a polar equation.

=== Quadratrix ===

A quadratrix in the first quadrant $(x, y)$ is a curve with $y = \rho \sin \theta$ equal to the fraction of the quarter circle with radius $r$ determined by the radius through the curve point. Since this fraction is: $\frac{2 r \theta}{\pi}$, the curve is given by
$$\rho (\theta) = \frac{2 r \theta}{\pi \sin \theta}.$$

=== Intersection of two polar curves ===
The graphs of two polar functions $r = f(\theta)$ and $r = g(\theta)$ have possible intersections of three types:

1. In the origin, if the equations $f(\theta) = 0$ and $g(\theta) = 0$ have at least one solution each.
2. All the points $[g(\theta_i),\theta_i]$ where $\theta_i$ are solutions to the equation $f(\theta+2k\pi)=g(\theta)$ where $k$ is an integer.
3. All the points $[g(\theta_i),\theta_i]$ where $\theta_i$ are solutions to the equation $f(\theta+(2k+1)\pi)=-g(\theta)$ where $k$ is an integer.

== Calculus ==
Calculus can be applied to equations expressed in polar coordinates.

The angular coordinate φ is expressed in radians throughout this section, which is the conventional choice when doing calculus.

=== Differential calculus ===
Using x = r cos φ and y = r sin φ, one can derive a relationship between derivatives in Cartesian and polar coordinates. For a given function, u(x,y), it follows that (by computing its total derivatives) or
$$\begin{align}
r \frac{du}{dr}
&= r \frac{\partial u}{\partial x} \cos\varphi  +
r \frac{\partial u}{\partial y} \sin\varphi
= x \frac{\partial u}{\partial x} + y \frac{\partial u}{\partial y}, \\[2pt]
\frac{du}{d\varphi}
&= - \frac{\partial u}{\partial x} r \sin\varphi +
\frac{\partial u}{\partial y} r \cos\varphi
= -y \frac{\partial u}{\partial x} + x \frac{\partial u}{\partial y}.
\end{align}$$

Hence, we have the following formula:
$$\begin{align}
r \frac{d}{dr} &=  x \frac{\partial}{\partial x} + y \frac{\partial}{\partial y} \\[2pt]
\frac{d}{d\varphi} &= -y \frac{\partial}{\partial x} + x \frac{\partial}{\partial y}.
\end{align}$$

Using the inverse coordinates transformation, an analogous reciprocal relationship can be derived between the derivatives. Given a function u(r,φ), it follows that
$$\begin{align}
\frac{du}{dx}
&= \frac{\partial u}{\partial r}\frac{\partial r}{\partial x} +
\frac{\partial u}{\partial \varphi}\frac{\partial \varphi}{\partial x}, \\[2pt]
\frac{du}{dy}
&= \frac{\partial u}{\partial r}\frac{\partial r}{\partial y} +
\frac{\partial u}{\partial \varphi}\frac{\partial \varphi}{\partial y},
\end{align}$$
or
$$\begin{align}
\frac{du}{dx}
&= \frac{\partial u}{\partial r}\frac{x}{\sqrt{x^2+y^2}} -
\frac{\partial u}{\partial \varphi}\frac{y}{x^2+y^2} \\[2pt]
&= \cos \varphi \frac{\partial u}{\partial r} -
\frac{1}{r} \sin\varphi \frac{\partial u}{\partial \varphi}, \\[2pt]
\frac{du}{dy}
&= \frac{\partial u}{\partial r}\frac{y}{\sqrt{x^2+y^2}} +
\frac{\partial u}{\partial \varphi}\frac{x}{x^2+y^2} \\[2pt]
&= \sin\varphi \frac{\partial u}{\partial r} +
\frac{1}{r} \cos\varphi \frac{\partial u}{\partial \varphi}.
\end{align}$$

Hence, we have the following formulae:
$$\begin{align}
\frac{d}{dx}
&= \cos \varphi \frac{\partial}{\partial r} -
\frac{1}{r} \sin\varphi \frac{\partial}{\partial \varphi} \\[2pt]
\frac{d}{dy}
&= \sin \varphi \frac{\partial}{\partial r} +
\frac{1}{r} \cos\varphi \frac{\partial}{\partial \varphi}.
\end{align}$$

To find the Cartesian slope of the tangent line to a polar curve r(φ) at any given point, the curve is first expressed as a system of parametric equations.
$$\begin{align}
x &= r(\varphi)\cos\varphi \\
y &= r(\varphi)\sin\varphi
\end{align}$$

Differentiating both equations with respect to φ yields
$$\begin{align}
\frac{dx}{d\varphi} &= r'(\varphi)\cos\varphi - r(\varphi)\sin\varphi \\[2pt]
\frac{dy}{d\varphi} &= r'(\varphi)\sin\varphi + r(\varphi)\cos\varphi.
\end{align}$$

Dividing the second equation by the first yields the Cartesian slope of the tangent line to the curve at the point $(r(\varphi), \varphi)$:
$$\frac{dy}{dx} = \frac{r'(\varphi)\sin\varphi + r(\varphi)\cos\varphi}{r'(\varphi)\cos\varphi-r(\varphi)\sin\varphi}.$$

For other useful formulas including divergence, gradient, and Laplacian in polar coordinates, see curvilinear coordinates.

=== Integral calculus ===
==== Arc length ====
The arc length (length of a line segment) defined by a polar function is found by the integration over the curve r(φ). Let L denote this length along the curve starting from points A through to point B, where these points correspond to φ = a and φ = b such that 0 < b − a < 2π. The length of L is given by the following integral
$$L = \int_a^b \sqrt{ \left[r(\varphi)\right]^2 + \left[ {\tfrac{dr(\varphi) }{ d\varphi }} \right] ^2 } d\varphi$$

==== Area ====
The integration region R is bounded by the curve r(φ) and the rays φ = a and φ = b.

Let R denote the region enclosed by a curve r(φ) and the rays φ = a and φ = b, where 0 < b − a ≤ 2π. Then, the area of R is
$$\frac12\int_a^b \left[r(\varphi)\right]^2\, d\varphi.$$

The region R is approximated by n sectors (here, n = 5).

This result can be found as follows. First, the interval [a, b] is divided into n subintervals, where n is some positive integer. Thus Δφ, the angle measure of each subinterval, is equal to b − a (the total angle measure of the interval), divided by n, the number of subintervals. For each subinterval i = 1, 2, ..., n, let φ_{i} be the midpoint of the subinterval, and construct a sector with the center at the pole, radius r(φ_{i}), central angle Δφ and arc length r(φ_{i})Δφ. The area of each constructed sector is therefore equal to
$$\pi \left[r(\varphi_i)\right]^2  \cdot \frac{\Delta \varphi}{2\pi} = \frac{1}{2}\left[r(\varphi_i)\right]^2 \Delta \varphi.$$
Hence, the total area of all of the sectors is
$$\sum_{i=1}^n \tfrac12r(\varphi_i)^2\,\Delta\varphi.$$

As the number of subintervals n is increased, the approximation of the area improves. Taking n → ∞, the sum becomes the Riemann sum for the above integral.

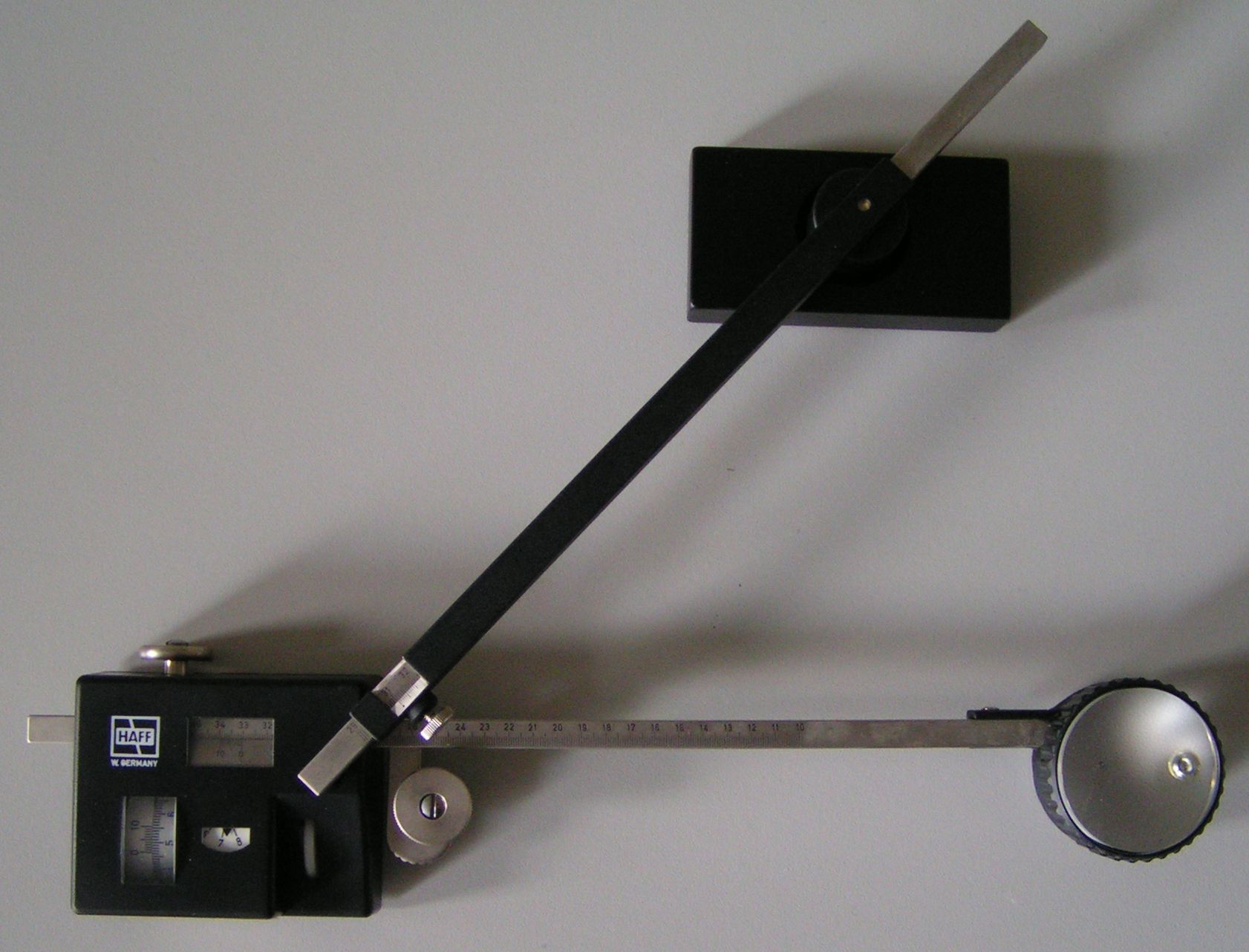
A planimeter, which mechanically computes polar integrals

A mechanical device that computes area integrals is the planimeter, which measures the area of plane figures by tracing them out: this replicates integration in polar coordinates by adding a joint so that the 2-element linkage effects Green's theorem, converting the quadratic polar integral to a linear integral.

===== Area generalization =====
Using Cartesian coordinates, an infinitesimal area element can be calculated as dA = dx dy. The substitution rule for multiple integrals states that, when using other coordinates, the Jacobian determinant of the coordinate conversion formula has to be considered:
$$J = \det \frac{\partial(x, y)}{\partial(r, \varphi)}
= \begin{vmatrix}
\frac{\partial x}{\partial r} & \frac{\partial x}{\partial \varphi} \\[2pt]
\frac{\partial y}{\partial r} & \frac{\partial y}{\partial \varphi}
\end{vmatrix}
= \begin{vmatrix}
\cos\varphi & -r\sin\varphi \\
\sin\varphi &  r\cos\varphi
\end{vmatrix}
= r\cos^2\varphi + r\sin^2\varphi = r.$$

Hence, an area element in polar coordinates can be written as
$$dA = dx\,dy\ = J\,dr\,d\varphi = r\,dr\,d\varphi.$$

Now, a function, that is given in polar coordinates, can be integrated as follows:
$$\iint_R f(x, y)\, dA = \int_a^b \int_{r_1(\varphi_1)}^{r_2(\varphi_2)} f(r, \varphi)\,r\,dr\,d\varphi.$$

Here, R is the same region as above, namely, the region enclosed by a curve r(φ) and the rays φ = a and φ = b. The formula for the area of R is retrieved by taking f identically equal to 1.

A graph of $f(x) = e^{-x^2}$ and the area between the function and the $x$-axis, which is equal to $\sqrt{\pi}$.

A more surprising application of this result yields the Gaussian integral:
$$\int_{-\infty}^\infty e^{-x^2} \, dx = \sqrt\pi.$$

=== Vector calculus ===
Vector calculus can also be applied to polar coordinates. For a planar motion, let $\mathbf{r}$ be the position vector (r cos(φ), r sin(φ)), with r and φ depending on time t.

We define an orthonormal basis with three unit vectors: radial, transverse, and normal directions. The radial direction is defined by normalizing $\mathbf{r}$:
$$\hat{\mathbf{r}} = (\cos(\varphi), \sin(\varphi))$$
Radial and velocity directions span the plane of motion, whose normal direction is denoted $\hat{\mathbf{k}}$:
$$\hat{\mathbf{k}} = \hat{\mathbf{v}} \times \hat{\mathbf{r}}.$$
The transverse direction is perpendicular to both radial and normal directions:
$$\hat \boldsymbol \varphi = (-\sin(\varphi), \cos(\varphi)) = \hat{\mathbf{k}} \times \hat{\mathbf{r}} \ ,$$

Then, position and velocity can be expressed as follows
$$\begin{align}
\mathbf{r}  &= (x,\ y) = r(\cos\varphi,\ \sin\varphi) = r \hat{\mathbf{r}}\ , \\[1.5ex]
\dot{\mathbf{r}} &= \left(\dot{x},\ \dot{y}\right) = \dot{r}(\cos\varphi,\ \sin\varphi) + r\dot{\varphi}(-\sin\varphi,\ \cos\varphi) = \dot{r}\hat{\mathbf{r}} + r\dot{\varphi}\hat{\boldsymbol{\varphi}}\ ,\\[1.5ex]
\end{align}$$
with the angular rate $\dot{\varphi}$ necessarily in radians per second (or multiples thereof), not in degrees per second. Acceleration can be expressed as:
$$\begin{align}
\ddot{\mathbf{r}} &= \left(\ddot{x},\ \ddot{y}\right) \\[1ex]
&= \ddot{r}(\cos\varphi,\ \sin\varphi) + 2\dot{r}\dot{\varphi}(-\sin\varphi,\ \cos\varphi) +  r\ddot{\varphi}(-\sin\varphi,\ \cos\varphi) - r\dot{\varphi}^2(\cos\varphi,\ \sin\varphi) \\[1ex]
&= \left(\ddot{r} - r\dot{\varphi}^2\right) \hat{\mathbf{r}} + \left(r\ddot{\varphi} + 2\dot{r}\dot{\varphi}\right) \hat{\boldsymbol{\varphi}} \\[1ex]
&= \left(\ddot{r} - r\dot{\varphi}^2\right) \hat{\mathbf{r}} + \frac{1}{r}\; \frac{d}{dt} \left(r^2\dot{\varphi}\right) \hat{\boldsymbol{\varphi}}.
\end{align}$$
This equation can be obtained by taking the derivative of the function and derivatives of the unit basis vectors.

For a curve in 2D where the parameter is $\theta$ the previous equations simplify to:
$$\begin{aligned}
\mathbf{r} &= r(\theta) \hat \mathbf{e}_r \\[1ex]
\frac {d\mathbf{r}}{d\theta} &= \frac {dr} {d\theta} \hat \mathbf{e}_r + r \hat \mathbf{e}_\theta\\[1ex]
\frac {d^2\mathbf{r}}{d\theta^2} &= \left(\frac {d^2 r} {d\theta^2}-r\right) \hat \mathbf{e}_r + 2\frac {dr} {d\theta} \hat \mathbf{e}_\theta
\end{aligned}$$

==== Centrifugal and Coriolis terms ====
The term $r\dot\varphi^2$ is sometimes referred to as the centripetal acceleration, and the term $2\dot r \dot\varphi$ as the Coriolis acceleration. For example, see Shankar. These terms, which appear when acceleration is expressed in polar coordinates, are a mathematical consequence of differentiation; they appear whenever polar coordinates are used. In planar particle dynamics, these accelerations appear when setting up Newton's second law of motion in a rotating frame of reference. Here, these extra terms are often called fictitious forces; fictitious because they are simply a result of a change in coordinate frame. That does not mean they do not exist; rather, they exist only in the rotating frame.

Position vector r, always points radially from the origin.

Velocity vector v, always tangent to the path of motion.

Acceleration vector a, not parallel to the radial motion but offset by the angular and Coriolis accelerations, nor tangent to the path but offset by the centripetal and radial accelerations.

Kinematic vectors in plane polar coordinates. Notice the setup is not restricted to two-dimensional space, but a plane in any higher dimension.

Inertial frame of reference S and instantaneous non-inertial co-rotating frame of reference S′. The co-rotating frame rotates at angular rate Ω equal to the rate of rotation of the particle about the origin of S′ at the particular moment t. Particle is located at vector position r(t) and unit vectors are shown in the radial direction to the particle from the origin, and also in the direction of increasing angle ϕ normal to the radial direction. These unit vectors need not be related to the tangent and normal to the path. Also, the radial distance r need not be related to the radius of curvature of the path.

===== Co-rotating frame =====
For a particle in planar motion, one approach to attaching physical significance to these terms is based on the concept of an instantaneous co-rotating frame of reference. To define a co-rotating frame of reference, first an origin is selected from which the distance r(t) to the particle is defined. An axis of rotation is set up that is perpendicular to the plane of motion of the particle, and passing through this origin. Then, at the selected moment t, the angular rate of the co-rotating frame Ω is made to match the rate of rotation of the particle about this axis, dφ/dt. Next, the terms in the acceleration in the inertial frame are related to those in the co-rotating frame.

Let the location of the particle in the inertial frame be (r(t), φ(t)), and in the co-rotating frame be denoted primed (r′(t), φ′(t)). Because the co-rotating frame rotates at the same rate as the particle, dφ′/dt = 0. The fictitious centrifugal force in the co-rotating frame is mrΩ^{2}, radially outward. The velocity of the particle in the co-rotating frame also is radially outward, because dφ′/dt = 0. The fictitious Coriolis force therefore has a value −2m(dr/dt)Ω, pointed in the direction of increasing φ only. Thus, using these forces in Newton's second law we find:
$$\mathbf{F} + \mathbf{F}_\text{cf} + \mathbf{F}_\text{Cor} = m\ddot{\mathbf{r}} \, ,$$
where over dots represent derivatives with respect to time, and F is the net real force (as opposed to the fictitious forces). In terms of components, this vector equation becomes:
$$\begin{align}
F_r + mr\Omega^2 &= m\ddot{r} \\
F_\varphi - 2m\dot{r}\Omega &= mr\ddot{\varphi} \ ,
\end{align}$$
which can be compared to the equations for the inertial frame:
$$\begin{align}
F_r &= m\ddot{r} - mr\dot{\varphi}^2 \\
F_\varphi &= mr\ddot{\varphi} + 2m\dot{r}\dot{\varphi} \ .
\end{align}$$

This comparison, plus the recognition that by the definition of the co-rotating frame at time t it has a rate of rotation Ω = dφ/dt, shows that we can interpret the terms in the acceleration (multiplied by the mass of the particle) as found in the inertial frame as the negative of the centrifugal and Coriolis forces that would be seen in the instantaneous, non-inertial co-rotating frame.

For general motion of a particle (as opposed to simple circular motion), the centrifugal and Coriolis forces in a particle's frame of reference commonly are referred to the instantaneous osculating circle of its motion, not to a fixed center of polar coordinates. For more detail, see centripetal force.

== Differential geometry ==
In the modern terminology of differential geometry, polar coordinates provide coordinate charts for the differentiable manifold R^{2} \ {(0,0)}, the plane minus the origin. In these coordinates, the Euclidean metric tensor is given by
$$ds^2 = dr^2 + r^2 d\theta^2.$$
This can be seen via the change of variables formula for the metric tensor, or by computing the differential forms dx, dy via the exterior derivative of the 0-forms x = r cos(θ), y = r sin(θ) and substituting them in the Euclidean metric tensor ds^{2} = dx^{2} + dy^{2}.

An elementary proof of the formula

Let $p_1=(x_1,y_1)=(r_1,\theta_1)$, and $p_2=(x_2,y_2)=(r_2,\theta_2)$ be two points in the plane given by their cartesian and polar coordinates. Then

$$ds^2=dx^2+dy^2=(x_2-x_1)^2+(y_2-y_1)^2.$$

Since $dx^2=(r_2\cos\theta_2-r_1\cos\theta_1)^2$, and $dy^2=(r_2\sin\theta_2-r_1\sin\theta_1)^2$, we get that

$$ds^2=r_2^2\cos^2\theta_2-2r_1r_2\cos\theta_1\cos\theta_2+r_1^2\cos^2\theta_1+r_2^2\sin^2\theta_2-2r_1r_2\sin\theta_1\sin\theta_2+r_1^2\sin^2\theta_1=$$
$$r_2^2(\cos^2\theta_2+\sin^2\theta_2)+r_1^2(\cos^2\theta_1+\sin^2\theta_1)-2r_1r_2(\cos\theta_1\cos\theta_2+\sin\theta_1\sin\theta_2)=$$
$$r_1^2+r_2^2-2r_1r_2(1-1+\cos\theta_1\cos\theta_2+\sin\theta_1\sin\theta_2)=$$
$$(r_2-r_1)^2+2r_1r_2(1-\cos\theta_1\cos\theta_2-\sin\theta_1\sin\theta_2).$$

Now we use the trigonometric identity $\cos(\theta_2-\theta_1)=\cos\theta_1\cos\theta_2+\sin\theta_1\sin\theta_2$ to proceed:

$$ds^2=dr^2+2r_1r_2(1-\cos d\theta).$$

If the radial and angular quantities are near to each other, and therefore near to a common quantity $r$ and $\theta$, we have that $r_1r_2\approx r^2$. Moreover, the cosine of $d\theta$ can be approximated with the Taylor series of the cosine up to linear terms:

$$\cos d\theta\approx1-\frac{d\theta^2}{2},$$

so that $1-\cos d\theta\approx\frac{d\theta^2}{2}$, and $2r_1r_2(1-\cos d\theta)\approx2r^2\frac{d\theta^2}{2}=r^2d\theta^2$. Therefore, around an infinitesimally small domain of any point,

$$ds^2=dr^2+r^2d\theta^2,$$

as stated.

An orthonormal frame with respect to this metric is given by
$$e_r = \frac{\partial}{\partial r}, \quad e_\theta = \frac1r \frac{\partial}{\partial \theta},$$
with dual coframe
$$e^r = dr, \quad e^\theta = r d\theta.$$
The connection form relative to this frame and the Levi-Civita connection is given by the skew-symmetric matrix of 1-forms
$${\omega^i}_j = \begin{pmatrix} 0 & -d\theta \\ d\theta & 0\end{pmatrix}$$
and hence the curvature form Ω = dω + ω∧ω vanishes. Therefore, as expected, the punctured plane is a flat manifold.

== Extensions in three-dimensional space ==
The polar coordinate system is extended into three dimensions with two different coordinate systems, the cylindrical and spherical coordinate systems, both of which include two-dimensional or planar polar coordinates as a subset. In essence, the cylindrical coordinate system extends polar coordinates by adding an additional distance coordinate, while the spherical system instead adds an additional angular coordinate.

=== Cylindrical coordinates ===
A cylindrical coordinate system with radial $\rho$, angle $\varphi$, and height $z$.

The cylindrical coordinate system is a coordinate system that essentially extends the two-dimensional polar coordinate system by adding a third coordinate measuring the height of a point above the plane, similar to the way in which the Cartesian coordinate system is extended into three dimensions. The third coordinate is denoted $z$, making the three cylindrical coordinates $(r, \theta, z)$. Thus, the three cylindrical coordinates can be converted to Cartesian coordinates by
$$\begin{align}
x &= r \, \cos\theta \\
y &= r \, \sin\theta \\
z &= z.
\end{align}$$

=== Spherical coordinates ===
A spherical coordinate system. Convened according to ISO 80000-2:2019, $r$, $\theta$, and $\varphi$ are respectively designates radial distance, polar angle (angle with respect to positive polar axis), and azimuthal angle (angle of rotation from the initial meridian plane).

Polar coordinates can also be extended into three dimensions using the coordinates (ρ, φ, θ), where ρ is the distance from the pole, φ is the angle from the z-axis (called the colatitude or zenith and measured from 0 to 180°), and θ is the angle from the x-axis (as in the polar coordinates). This coordinate system, called the spherical coordinate system, is similar to the latitude and longitude system used for Earth, with the latitude δ being the complement of φ, determined by δ = 90° − φ, and the longitude l being measured by l = θ − 180°.

The three spherical coordinates are converted to Cartesian coordinates by

$$\begin{align}
x &= \rho \, \sin\varphi \, \cos\theta \\
y &= \rho \, \sin\varphi \, \sin\theta \\
z &= \rho \, \cos\varphi.
\end{align}$$

== Applications ==
Polar coordinates are two-dimensional and thus they can be used only where point positions lie on a single two-dimensional plane. They are most appropriate in any context where the phenomenon being considered is inherently tied to direction and length from a center point. For instance, the examples above show how elementary polar equations suffice to define curves—such as the Archimedean spiral—whose equation in the Cartesian coordinate system would be much more intricate. Moreover, many physical systems—such as those concerned with bodies moving around a central point or with phenomena originating from a central point—are simpler and more intuitive to model using polar coordinates. The initial motivation for the introduction of the polar system was the study of circular and orbital motion.

=== Position and navigation ===
Polar coordinates are used often in navigation as the destination or direction of travel can be given as an angle and distance from the object being considered. For instance, aircraft use a slightly modified version of the polar coordinates for navigation. In this system, the one generally used for any sort of navigation, the 0° ray is generally called heading 360, and the angles continue in a clockwise direction, rather than counterclockwise, as in the mathematical system. Heading 360 corresponds to magnetic north, while headings 90, 180, and 270 correspond to magnetic east, south, and west, respectively. Thus, an aircraft traveling 5 nautical miles due east will be traveling 5 units at heading 90 (read zero-niner-zero by air traffic control).

=== Modeling ===
Systems displaying radial symmetry provide natural settings for the polar coordinate system, with the central point acting as the pole. A prime example of this usage is the groundwater flow equation when applied to radially symmetric wells. Systems with a radial force are also good candidates for the use of the polar coordinate system. These systems include gravitational fields, which obey the inverse-square law, as well as systems with point sources, such as radio antennas.

Radially asymmetric systems may also be modeled with polar coordinates. For example, a microphone's pickup pattern illustrates its proportional response to an incoming sound from a given direction, and these patterns can be represented as polar curves. The curve for a standard cardioid microphone, the most common unidirectional microphone, can be represented as r = 0.5 + 0.5sin(ϕ) at its target design frequency. The pattern shifts toward omnidirectionality at lower frequencies.

== See also ==
- 2D rotation
- Curvilinear coordinates
- List of common coordinate transformations
- Log-polar coordinates
- Polar decomposition
- Unit circle
