= William Mears =

William Mears may refer to:

- William Mears (politician) (19th century), Illinois Attorney General
- William Mears (publisher) (1686–?), English publisher and entrepreneur
