= Daniel Demoivre =

Huguenot composer (c.1675–c.1731)

- Born: Daniel Moivre c. 1675; Vitry-le-François, Champagne, France
- Died: c. 1731–1737 (aged approx. 56–62) London, Great Britain
- Genres: Baroque music
- Occupations: Composer; musician; music teacher
- Instrument: Recorder
- Years active: 1695–1731

Daniel Demoivre (c. 1675 – c. 1731) was a Baroque recorder (flute) player, composer and music teacher who spent most of his professional life in London. He is known for his published collections of aires and solos written for the treble (alto) recorder. He was the younger brother of the celebrated French mathematician Abraham de Moivre.

== Biography ==
=== Early life and emigration ===
Demoivre was the son of a surgeon, born in Vitry-le-François in Champagne, France and raised in a Huguenot family. He likely had lessons in recorder and composition as a child. He moved to England at a young age due to the religious persecution of Protestants in France, which reached a climax in 1685 when the Edict of Nantes was revoked. His older brother, Abraham, was briefly imprisoned for his faith. Both Daniel and Abraham fled to England, where they officially became British denizens on 16 December 1687. Their original family name appears to have been simply Moivre, but upon settling in London the brothers adopted the noble preposition "De", perhaps to elevate their social status to that of their aristocratic pupils.

=== Career in London ===
In England, Demoivre made his living primarily as a music teacher. In 1695, a proposal was made to establish Royal Academies for public artistic instruction. Demoivre was designated as a primary recorder instructor alongside notable contemporary woodwind masters Jacques Paisible and John Banister II. However, the academy project collapsed due to an impractical lottery admission system.

The 1715-1716 diaries of law student Dudley Ryder mentioned instances of Demoivre playing recorder at the London Coffee House and an unidentified tavern. On 27 February 1717, Demoivre performed at the Leathersellers Hall in Bishopgate. Although advertised as the opening concert for an acclaimed series of concerts, they did not continue.

Unlike the more well known recorder players of the period, such as Jacques Paisible and Jean-Baptiste Loeillet of London, who made their primary income as orchestral oboists or string players, Demoivre appears to have only played the recorder, limiting his income potential.

=== Personal and family life ===
Registers from the West Street Protestant (Huguenot) church in Westminster indicate Demoivre's wife was named Anne and they had three children: born in 1707-1709. They resided on Earl Street (modern-day Earlham Street) in Westminster, adjacent to Degory Coffee House.

The final recorded entry mentioning Demoivre occurs in November 1731, when he served as a godfather to one of his wife's nieces. He is presumed to have died before 1738, as his name is completely absent from the initial enrollment records of the Royal Society of Musicians of Great Britain founded that year.

== Compositions and musical style ==
All of Demoivre's known music was written for the recorder and listed as "aires" or "lessons" for the flute. His pieces were popular and remained in circulation for about forty years following their publication. There are three known collections of his work, published by Walsh from 1701 through 1730.

His first collection Lessons for a single flute, as Preludes, Almands, Sarabands, Corants, Minuets and Jiggs. Made purposely for the Flute by Mr. Daniel Demoivre was published in 1701 and consists of 18 pieces or movements in a variety of dance forms and in a variety of keys.

His second published work Aires for a Flute and a Bass, as Preludes, Almands, Sarabands, Corants, Minuets and Jiggs made purposely for the Flute by Mr. Daniel Demoire. Ye 2d Collection, was advertised in the March 2-4 edition of The Post Man in 1704. The bass part has the heading "Flutto Basso" and is unfigured, implying it was written for bass recorder. The 21 movements can be viewed as five dance suites plus two extra Sarabands.

His third collection Aires made on purpose for a flute as Allemands, Gavotts, Sarabands, Minuets and Jiggs for the Improvement of the hand, with a Great Variety of Aire Suitted to the Instrument Compos'd by Mr. Demoivre. 3rd Collection, has an uncertain publication date with sources indicating both 1705 and 1715. The 31 movements can be grouped into 7 suites plus two additional movements.

=== Musical style ===
The pieces written by Demoivre, though not difficult to play, are made interesting with variety in content, using a wide harmonic range and varied rhythms. He keeps awkward fingerings at a minimum. His work includes mostly short, pretty movements with a minor degree of difficulty. While they could be used for instructing beginners, they also have musical and technical value.

The second collection, by including a bass part, distinguishes his work from earlier recorder duets by writing for solo recorder with accompaniment. This places his work at the transition between treble recorder duets and sonatas for solo recorder with accompaniment on harpsichord or other instruments.

=== Works ===
- Lessons for a single flute, as Preludes, Almands, Sarabands, Corants, Minuets and Jiggs. Made purposely for the Flute by Mr. Daniel Demoivre. (1701)
- Aires for a Flute and a Bass, as Preludes, Almands, Sarabands, Corants, Minuets and Jiggs made purposely for the Flute by Mr. Daniel Demoire. Ye 2d Collection. (1704)
- Aires made on purpose for a flute as Allemands, Gavotts, Sarabands, Minuets and Jiggs for the Improvement of the hand, with a Great Variety of Aire Suitted to the Instrument Compos'd by Mr. Demoivre. 3rd Collection. (1705–1715).

== Manuscripts and arrangements ==
Several dance tunes credited to Demoivre reside in the British Library in a manuscript compiled by William Pitt around 1722. These include "An Aire" (Rondo) in D minor and a "Jigg" in G major.

Three of the aires from Demoivre's second collection appear in The Compleat Musick Master of 1722.
