= The Doctrine of Chances =

Textbook by Abraham de Moivre

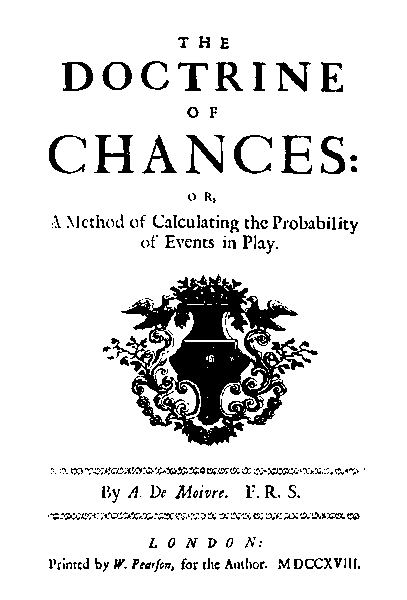
- Front page of first edition
- Author: Abraham de Moivre
- Original title: The Doctrine of Chances: A Method of Calculating the Probability of Events in Play
- Language: English
- Subject: Probability
- Publisher: W. Pearson
- Publication date: 1718
- Publication place: London, England

The Doctrine of Chances was the first textbook on probability theory, written by 18th-century French mathematician Abraham de Moivre and first published in 1718. De Moivre wrote in English because he resided in England at the time, having fled France to escape the persecution of Huguenots. The book's title came to be synonymous with probability theory, and accordingly the phrase was used in Thomas Bayes' famous posthumous paper An Essay Towards Solving a Problem in the Doctrine of Chances, wherein a version of Bayes' theorem was first introduced.

== Editions ==
The full title of the first edition was The Doctrine of Chances: or, A Method of Calculating the Probability of Events in Play. It was published in 1718, by W. Pearson, and ran for 175 pages. Published in 1738 by Woodfall and running for 258 pages, the second edition of de Moivre's book introduced the concept of normal distributions as approximations to binomial distributions. In effect de Moivre proved a special case of the central limit theorem. Sometimes his result is called the theorem of de Moivre–Laplace. A third edition was published posthumously in 1756 by A. Millar and ran for 348 pages. Additional material in the third edition included an application of probability theory to actuarial science in the calculation of annuities.
