= Jean Prestet =

French priest and mathematician (1648–1690)

- Born: 1648; Chalon-sur-Saône
- Died: 8 June 1690 (aged 41–42)
- Scientific career
- Fields: Mathematics
- Academic advisors: Nicolas Malebranche

Jean Prestet (1648–1690) was a French Oratorian priest and mathematician who contributed to the fields of combinatorics and number theory.

Prestet grew up poor. As a teenager, he worked as a servant of the Oratory of Jesus in Paris. He was promoted to secretary for Nicolas Malebranche, who taught him mathematics.

Under the guidance of Malebranche, Prestet began work in 1670 on the textbook Elémens des Mathématiques. Unusually for the time, the textbook focused exclusively on algebra but did not cover geometry at all. Prestet believed that algebra was the most fundamental field of mathematics, and geometry merely applied algebra. Gert Schubring writes that "[t]he self-confidence of Prestet in claiming superiority for the 'moderns' over the 'ancients' … proved to be a bold and modernizing approach, disseminating Cartesian conceptions and preparing the way for rationalism in France."

The book contained a proof of Descartes' rule of signs that Prestet later acknowledged to be incomplete. It also included a generalization of Euclid's lemma to non-prime divisors.

Elémens was published in 1675 by the Oratorian order for use in the curriculum of the many Oratorian colleges. Starting in the early 17th century, the order had founded colleges in smaller cities and towns to challenge the influence of the Jesuits. Elémens was one of several textbooks published around that time by notable Oratorian mathematics instructors including Bernard Lamy. Abraham de Moivre used Elémens in an abortive early attempt to teach himself mathematics.

With the publication of Elémens, Prestet's reputation as a mathematics instructor grew. He was appointed the mathematical chair at the University of Angers in 1681. A revised and expanded edition, titled Nouveaux Elémens des mathématiques, was published in 1689. This edition included some early work on the fundamental theorem of arithmetic.
