= Abraham de Moivre =

French mathematician (1667–1754)

Abraham de Moivre FRS
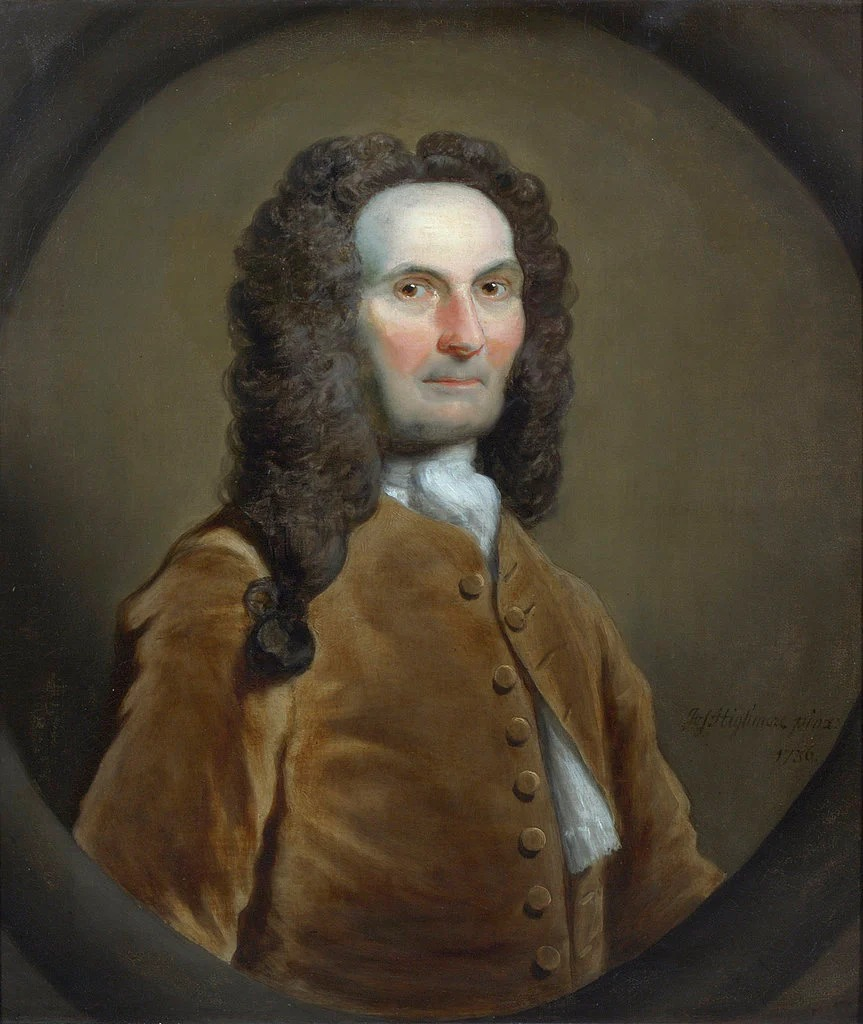
- de Moivre by Joseph Highmore, 1736
- Born: 26 May 1667; Vitry-le-François, Champagne (province), Kingdom of France
- Died: 27 November 1754 (aged 87); London, England
- Education: Academy of Saumur; Collège d'Harcourt
- Known for: De Moivre's formula De Moivre's law De Moivre's martingale De Moivre–Laplace theorem Inclusion–exclusion principle Generating function Prediction of his own death
- Scientific career
- Fields: Mathematics

Abraham de Moivre (French pronunciation: [abʁaam də mwavʁ]; 26 May 1667 – 27 November 1754) was a French mathematician known for de Moivre's formula, a formula that links complex numbers and trigonometry, and for his work on the normal distribution and probability theory.

He moved to England at a young age due to the religious persecution of Huguenots in France which reached a climax in 1685 with the Edict of Fontainebleau. He was a friend of Isaac Newton, Edmond Halley, and James Stirling. Among his fellow Huguenot exiles in England, he was a colleague of the editor and translator Pierre des Maizeaux.

De Moivre wrote a book on probability theory, The Doctrine of Chances, said to have been prized by gamblers. De Moivre first discovered Binet's formula, the closed-form expression for Fibonacci numbers linking the nth power of the golden ratio φ to the nth Fibonacci number. He also was the first to postulate the central limit theorem, a cornerstone of probability theory, of which he proved a special case.

== Life ==
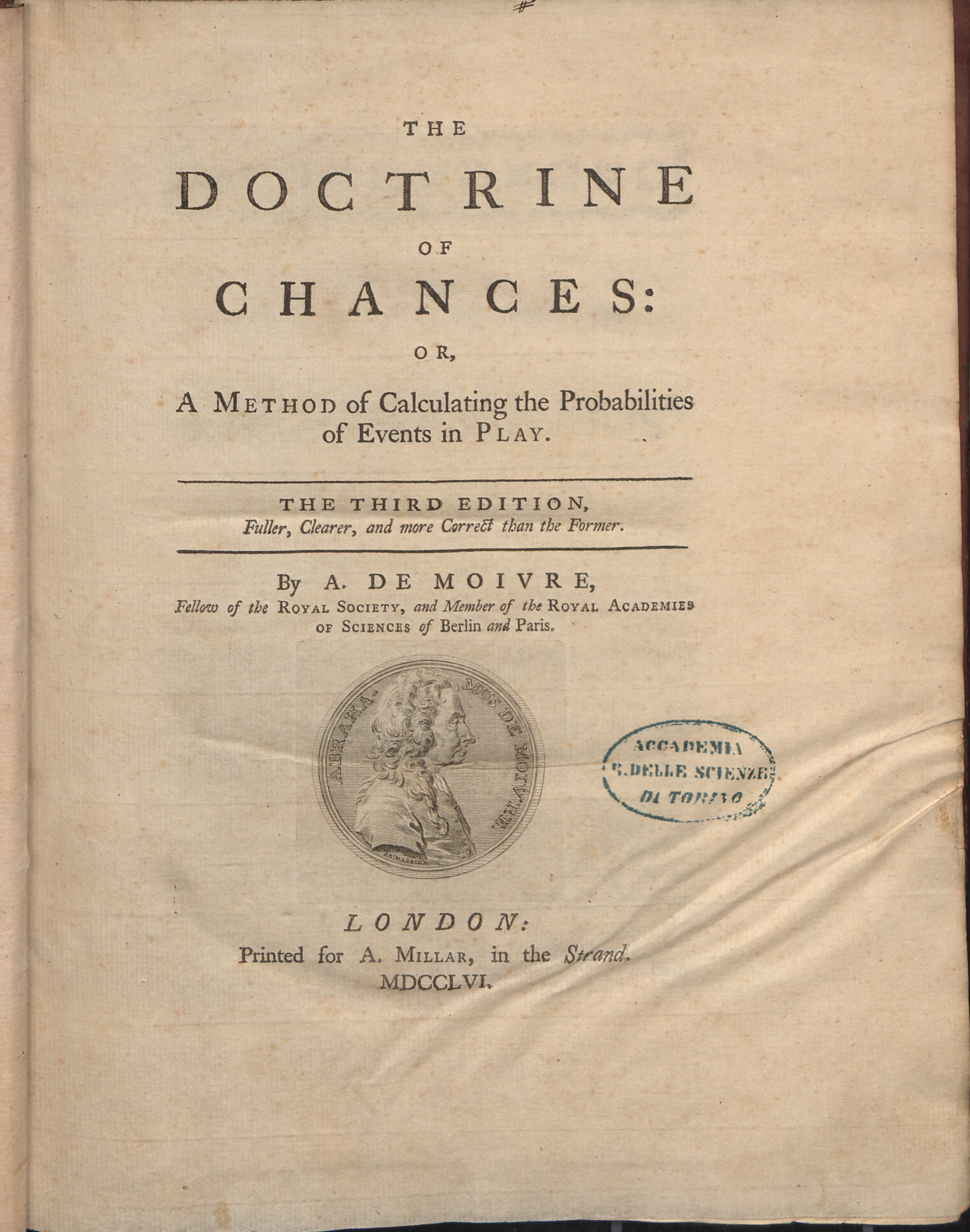
Doctrine of chances, 1756

=== Early years ===
Abraham de Moivre was born in Vitry-le-François in Champagne on 26 May 1667. His father, Daniel de Moivre, was a surgeon who believed in the value of education. Though Abraham de Moivre's parents were Protestant, he first attended the Christian Brothers' Catholic school in Vitry, which was unusually tolerant given religious tensions in France at the time. When he was eleven, his parents sent him to the Protestant Academy at Sedan, where he spent four years studying Greek under Jacques du Rondel. The Protestant Academy of Sedan had been founded in 1579 at the initiative of Françoise de Bourbon, the widow of Henri-Robert de la Marck.

In 1682 the Protestant Academy at Sedan was suppressed, and de Moivre enrolled to study logic at Saumur for two years. Although mathematics was not part of his course work, de Moivre read several works on mathematics on his own, including Éléments des mathématiques by the French Oratorian priest and mathematician Jean Prestet and a short treatise on games of chance, De Ratiociniis in Ludo Aleae, by Christiaan Huygens the Dutch physicist, mathematician, astronomer and inventor. In 1684, de Moivre moved to Paris to study physics, and for the first time had formal mathematics training with private lessons from Jacques Ozanam.

Religious persecution in France became severe when King Louis XIV issued the Edict of Fontainebleau in 1685, which revoked the Edict of Nantes, that had given substantial rights to French Protestants. It forbade Protestant worship and required that all children be baptised by Catholic priests. De Moivre was sent to Prieuré Saint-Martin-des-Champs, a school to which the authorities sent Protestant children for indoctrination into Catholicism.

It is unclear when de Moivre left the Prieuré de Saint-Martin and moved to England, since the records of the Prieuré de Saint-Martin indicate that he left the school in 1688. However, de Moivre and his brother, Daniel Demoivre, presented themselves as Huguenots admitted to the Savoy Church in London on 28 August 1687.

=== Middle years ===
By the time he arrived in London, de Moivre was a competent mathematician with a good knowledge of many of the standard texts. To make a living, de Moivre became a private tutor of mathematics, visiting his pupils or teaching in the coffee houses of London. De Moivre continued his studies of mathematics after visiting the Earl of Devonshire and seeing Newton's recent book, Principia Mathematica. Looking through the book, he realised that it was far deeper than the books that he had studied previously, and he became determined to read and understand it. However, as he was required to take extended walks around London to travel between his students, de Moivre had little time for study, so he tore pages from the book and carried them around in his pocket to read between lessons.

According to a possibly apocryphal story, Newton, in the later years of his life, used to refer people posing mathematical questions to him to de Moivre, saying, "He knows all these things better than I do."

By 1692, de Moivre became friends with Edmond Halley and soon after with Isaac Newton himself. In 1695, Halley communicated de Moivre's first mathematics paper, which arose from his study of fluxions in the Principia Mathematica, to the Royal Society. This paper was published in the Philosophical Transactions that same year. Shortly after publishing this paper, de Moivre also generalised Newton's noteworthy binomial theorem into the multinomial theorem. The Royal Society became apprised of this method in 1697, and it elected de Moivre a Fellow on 30 November 1697.

After de Moivre had been accepted, Halley encouraged him to turn his attention to astronomy. In 1705, de Moivre discovered, intuitively, that "the centripetal force of any planet is directly related to its distance from the centre of the forces and reciprocally related to the product of the diameter of the evolute and the cube of the perpendicular on the tangent." In other words, if a planet, M, follows an elliptical orbit around a focus F and has a point P where PM is tangent to the curve and FPM is a right angle so that FP is the perpendicular to the tangent, then the centripetal force at point P is proportional to FM/(R*(FP)^{3}) where R is the radius of the curvature at M. The Swiss mathematician Johann Bernoulli proved this formula in 1710.

Despite these successes, de Moivre was unable to obtain an appointment to a chair of mathematics at any university, which would have released him from his dependence on time-consuming tutoring that burdened him more than it did most other mathematicians of the time. At least a part of the reason was a bias against his French origins.

In November 1697 he was elected a Fellow of the Royal Society and in 1712 was appointed to a commission set up by the society, alongside MM. Arbuthnot, Hill, Halley, Jones, Machin, Burnet, Robarts, Bonet, Aston, and Taylor to review the claims of Newton and Leibniz as to who discovered calculus. The full details of the controversy can be found in the Leibniz and Newton calculus controversy article.

Throughout his life de Moivre remained poor. It is reported that he was a regular customer of old Slaughter's Coffee House, St. Martin's Lane at Cranbourn Street, where he earned a little money from playing chess.

=== Later years ===
De Moivre continued studying the fields of probability and mathematics until his death in 1754. Several additional papers were published after his death. As he grew older, he became increasingly lethargic and needed longer sleeping hours. It is a common claim that De Moivre noted he was sleeping an extra 15 minutes each night and correctly calculated the date of his death as the day when the sleep time reached 24 hours, 27 November 1754. On that day he did in fact die, in London and his body was buried at St Martin-in-the-Fields, although his body was later moved. The claim of him predicting his own death, however, has been disputed as not having been documented anywhere at the time of its occurrence.

== Probability ==
De Moivre pioneered the development of analytic geometry and the theory of probability by expanding upon the work of his predecessors, particularly Christiaan Huygens and several members of the Bernoulli family. He also produced the second textbook on probability theory, The Doctrine of Chances: a method of calculating the probabilities of events in play. (The first book about games of chance, Liber de ludo aleae (On Casting the Die), was written by Girolamo Cardano in the 1560s, but it was not published until 1663.) This book came out in four editions, 1711 in Latin, and in English in 1718, 1738, and 1756. In the later editions of his book, de Moivre included his unpublished result of 1733, which is the first statement of an approximation to the binomial distribution in terms of what we now call the normal or Gaussian function. This was the first method of finding the probability of the occurrence of an error of a given size when that error is expressed in terms of the variability of the distribution as a unit, and the first identification of the calculation of probable error. In addition, he applied these theories to gambling problems and actuarial tables.

An expression commonly found in probability is n! but before the days of calculators calculating n! for a large n was time-consuming. In 1733 de Moivre proposed the formula for estimating a factorial as n! = cn^{(n + 1/2)}e^{−n}. He obtained an approximate expression for the constant c but it was James Stirling who found that c is √2π.

De Moivre also published an article called "Annuities upon Lives" in which he revealed the normal distribution of the mortality rate over a person's age. From this he produced a simple formula for approximating the revenue produced by annual payments based on a person's age. This is similar to the types of formulas used by insurance companies today.

=== Priority regarding the Poisson distribution ===
Some results on the Poisson distribution were first introduced by de Moivre in De Mensura Sortis seu; de Probabilitate Eventuum in Ludis a Casu Fortuito Pendentibus in Philosophical Transactions of the Royal Society, p. 219. As a result, some authors have argued that the Poisson distribution should bear the name of de Moivre.

== De Moivre's formula ==
In 1707, de Moivre derived an equation from which one can deduce:

$$\cos x = \tfrac{1}{2} (\cos(nx) + i\sin(nx))^{1/n} + \tfrac{1}{2}(\cos(nx) - i\sin(nx))^{1/n}$$

which he was able to prove for all positive integers n. In 1722, he presented equations from which one can deduce the better known form of de Moivre's Formula:

$(\cos x + i\sin x)^n = \cos(nx) + i\sin(nx). \,$

In 1749 Euler proved this formula for any integer n using Euler's formula, which makes the proof quite straightforward. This formula is important because it relates complex numbers and trigonometry. Additionally, this formula allows the derivation of useful expressions for cos(nx) and sin(nx) in terms of cos(x) and sin(x).

== Stirling's approximation ==
De Moivre had been studying probability, and his investigations required him to calculate binomial coefficients, which in turn required him to calculate factorials. In 1730 de Moivre published his book Miscellanea Analytica de Seriebus et Quadraturis [Analytic Miscellany of Series and Integrals], which included tables of log (n!). For large values of n, de Moivre approximated the coefficients of the terms in a binomial expansion. Specifically, given a positive integer n, where n is even and large, then the coefficient of the middle term of (a + b)^{n} is approximated by the equation:

$${n \choose n/2} = \frac {n!}{((\frac {n}{2})!)^2} \approx 2^n \frac{2 \frac{21}{125} {(n-1)}^{n-\frac{1}{2}}}{n^n}$$

On 19 June 1729, James Stirling sent to de Moivre a letter, which illustrated how he calculated the coefficient of the middle term of a binomial expansion (a + b)^{n} for large values of n. In 1730, Stirling published his book Methodus Differentialis [The Differential Method], in which he included his series for log(n!):

$$\log_{10} (n + \frac {1}{2})! \approx \log_{10} \sqrt{2\pi} + n \log_{10} n  - \frac {n} {\ln 10},$$

so that for large $n$, $n! \approx \sqrt{2\pi n} \left(\frac {n}{e}\right)^n$.

On 12 November 1733, de Moivre privately published and distributed a pamphlet – Approximatio ad Summam Terminorum Binomii (a + b)^{n} in Seriem expansi [Approximation of the Sum of the Terms of the Binomial (a + b)^{n} expanded into a Series] – in which he acknowledged Stirling's letter and proposed an alternative expression for the central term of a binomial expansion.

== See also ==
- De Moivre number
- De Moivre quintic
- Economic model
- Gaussian integral
- Poisson distribution
