= William Mears (publisher) =

English publisher (1686–1740)

- Born: 1686
- Died: c. 1740
- Citizenship: Kingdom of Great Britain
- Occupations: English publisher, bookseller and entrepreneur

William Mears (1686 – c.1740) was an eighteenth century English publisher and entrepreneur noted for his publication of scientific books.

Mears was involved with a broad range of scientists, both as a publisher and as a provider of books. In 1719 he advertised in the Post Man for subscribers to Richard Bradley's A philosophical account of the works of nature for a total cost of 30 shillings, half to be paid for at the time of subscription, the other half to be paid for on delivery. he promised the book would be available in autumn 1720. Subscribers would have their names recorded for posterity in a list included in the book, and those ordering six copies would get a seventh free. True to his word, in September 1720, he announced that the book was almost ready, offering a last chance for subscription as he would not print more than what was required to meet these advance orders. The book was made available in December 1720. Isaac Newton and Hans Sloane were amongst the subscribers.
