= List of common coordinate transformations =

This is a list of some of the most commonly used coordinate transformations.

== 2-dimensional ==
Let $(x, y)$ be the standard Cartesian coordinates, and $(r, \theta)$ the standard polar coordinates.

=== To Cartesian coordinates ===
==== From polar coordinates ====
$$\begin{align}
x &= r\cos\theta \\
y &= r\sin\theta \\[5pt]
\frac{\partial(x, y)}{\partial(r, \theta)} &= \begin{bmatrix}
\cos\theta & -r\sin\theta  \\
\sin\theta & \phantom{-}r\cos\theta
\end{bmatrix} \\[5pt]
\text{Jacobian} = \det{\frac{\partial(x, y)}{\partial(r, \theta)}} &= r
\end{align}$$

==== From log-polar coordinates ====
$$\begin{align}
x &= e^\rho\cos\theta, \\
y &= e^\rho\sin\theta.
\end{align}$$

By using complex numbers $(x, y) = x + iy'$, the transformation can be written as
$$x + iy = e^{\rho + i\theta}$$

That is, it is given by the complex exponential function.

==== From bipolar coordinates ====
$$\begin{align}
x &= a \frac{\sinh \tau}{\cosh \tau - \cos \sigma} \\
y &= a \frac{\sin \sigma}{\cosh \tau - \cos \sigma}
\end{align}$$

==== From 2-center bipolar coordinates ====
$$\begin{align}
x &= \frac{1}{4c}\left(r_1^2 - r_2^2\right) \\[1ex]
y &= \pm \frac{1}{4c}\sqrt{16c^2 r_1^2 - \left(r_1^2 - r_2^2 + 4c^2\right)^2}
\end{align}$$

==== From Cesàro equation ====
$$\begin{align}
x &= \int \cos \left[\int \kappa(s) \,ds\right] ds \\
y &= \int \sin \left[\int \kappa(s) \,ds\right] ds
\end{align}$$

=== To polar coordinates ===
==== From Cartesian coordinates ====
$$\begin{align}
r &= \sqrt{x^2 + y^2} \\
\theta' &= \arctan\left|\frac{y}{x}\right|
\end{align}$$
Note: solving for $\theta'$ returns the resultant angle in the first quadrant ($0 < \theta < \frac{\pi}{2}$). To find $\theta,$ one must refer to the original Cartesian coordinate, determine the quadrant in which $\theta$ lies (for example, (3,−3) [Cartesian] lies in QIV), then use the following to solve for $\theta:$

$$\theta = \begin{cases}
\theta' & \text{for } \theta' \text{ in QI: } & 0 < \theta' < \frac{\pi}{2} \\[1.2ex]
\pi - \theta' & \text{for } \theta' \text{ in QII: } &\frac{\pi}{2} < \theta' < \pi \\[1.2ex]
\pi + \theta' & \text{for } \theta' \text{ in QIII: }& \pi < \theta' < \frac{3\pi}{2} \\[1.2ex]
2\pi - \theta' & \text{for } \theta' \text{ in QIV: } &\frac{3\pi}{2} < \theta' < 2\pi
\end{cases}$$

The value for $\theta$ must be solved for in this manner because for all values of $\theta$, $\tan\theta$ is only defined for $-\frac{\pi}{2}<\theta<+\frac{\pi}{2}$, and is periodic (with period $\pi$). This means that the inverse function will only give values in the domain of the function, but restricted to a single period. Hence, the range of the inverse function is only half a full circle.

Note that one can also use
$$\begin{align}
r &= \sqrt{x^2 + y^2} \\
\theta' &= 2 \arctan \frac{y}{x + r}
\end{align}$$

==== From 2-center bipolar coordinates ====
$$\begin{align}
r &= \sqrt{\frac{r_1^2 + r_2^2 - 2c^2}{2}} \\
\theta &= \arctan \left[\sqrt{\frac{8c^2(r_1^2 + r_2^2 - 2c^2)}{r_1^2 - r_2^2} - 1}\right]
\end{align}$$

Where 2c is the distance between the poles.

=== To log-polar coordinates from Cartesian coordinates ===
$$\begin{align}
\rho &= \log\sqrt{x^2 + y^2}, \\
\theta &= \arctan \frac{y}{x}.
\end{align}$$

=== Arc-length and curvature ===
==== In Cartesian coordinates ====
$$\begin{align}
\kappa &= \frac{x'y'' - y'x''}{\left({x'}^2 + {y'}^2\right)^\frac{3}{2}} \\
s &= \int_a^t \sqrt{{x'}^2 + {y'}^2}\, dt
\end{align}$$

==== In polar coordinates ====
$$\begin{align}
\kappa &= \frac{r^2 + 2{r'}^2 - rr''}{(r^2 + {r'}^2)^\frac{3}{2}} \\
s &= \int_a^\varphi \sqrt{r^2 + {r'}^2}\, d\varphi
\end{align}$$

== 3-dimensional ==
For spherical coordinates, this article uses the convention that $r$ is radial distance, $\theta$ is the zenith angle, and $\phi$ is the azimuthal angle.

Let (x, y, z) be the standard Cartesian coordinates, and (ρ, θ, φ) the spherical coordinates, with θ the angle measured away from the +Z axis (as illustrated). As φ has a range of 360° the same considerations as in polar (2 dimensional) coordinates apply whenever an arctangent of it is taken. θ has a range of 180°, running from 0° to 180°, and does not pose any problem when calculated from an arccosine, but beware for an arctangent.

If, in the alternative definition, θ is chosen to run from −90° to +90°, in opposite direction of the earlier definition, it can be found uniquely from an arcsine, but beware of an arccotangent. In this case in all formulas below all arguments in θ should have sine and cosine exchanged, and as derivative also a plus and minus exchanged.

All divisions by zero result in special cases of being directions along one of the main axes and are in practice most easily solved by observation.

=== To Cartesian coordinates ===
==== From spherical coordinates ====
$$\begin{align}
x &= \rho \, \sin\theta\cos\varphi\\
y &= \rho \, \sin\theta\sin\varphi\\
z &= \rho \, \cos\theta \\
\frac{\partial(x, y, z)}{\partial(\rho, \theta, \varphi)}
&= \begin{pmatrix}
\sin\theta\cos\varphi &  \rho\cos\theta\cos\varphi & -\rho\sin\theta\sin\varphi \\
\sin\theta\sin\varphi &  \rho\cos\theta\sin\varphi &  \rho\sin\theta\cos\varphi \\
\cos\theta         &  -\rho\sin\theta        &  0
\end{pmatrix}
\end{align}$$

So for the volume element:
$$dx\,dy\,dz = \det{\frac{\partial(x, y, z)}{\partial(\rho, \theta, \varphi)}}\,d\rho\,d\theta\,d\varphi
= \rho^2 \sin\theta \,d\rho \,d\theta \,d\varphi$$

==== From cylindrical coordinates ====
$$\begin{align}
x &= r \, \cos\theta\\
y &= r \, \sin\theta \\
z &= z \, \\
\frac{\partial(x, y, z)}{\partial(r, \theta, z)}
&= \begin{pmatrix}
\cos\theta & -r\sin\theta & 0 \\
\sin\theta &  r\cos\theta & 0 \\
0 &            0 & 1
\end{pmatrix}
\end{align}$$

So for the volume element:
$$dV = dx\,dy\,dz = \det{\frac{\partial(x, y, z)}{\partial(r, \theta, z)}}\,dr\,d\theta\,dz
= r \,dr \,d\theta \,dz$$

=== To spherical coordinates ===
==== From Cartesian coordinates ====
$$\begin{align}
\rho   &= \sqrt{x^2 + y^2 + z^2} \\
\theta &= \arctan \left( \frac{\sqrt{x^2 + y^2}}{z} \right)=\arccos \left( {\frac{z}{\sqrt{x^2 + y^2 + z^2}}} \right) \\
\varphi   &= \arctan \left( {\frac{y}{x}} \right) = \arccos \left( \frac{x}{\sqrt{x^2 + y^2}}\right) = \arcsin \left( \frac{y}{\sqrt{x^2 + y^2}}\right) \\
\frac{\partial\left(\rho, \theta, \varphi\right)}{\partial\left(x, y, z\right)}
&= \begin{pmatrix}
\frac{x}{\rho}                    & \frac{y}{\rho}                    &  \frac{z}{\rho} \\
\frac{xz}{\rho^2\sqrt{x^2 + y^2}} & \frac{yz}{\rho^2\sqrt{x^2 + y^2}} & -\frac{\sqrt{x^2 + y^2}}{\rho^2} \\
\frac{-y}{x^2 + y^2}              & \frac{x}{x^2 + y^2}               &  0 \\
\end{pmatrix}
\end{align}$$

See also the article on atan2 for how to elegantly handle some edge cases.

So for the element:
$$d\rho\,d\theta\,d\varphi=\det\frac{\partial(\rho,\theta,\varphi)}{\partial(x,y,z)}\,dx\,dy\,dz=\frac{1}{\sqrt{x^2+y^2}\sqrt{x^2+y^2+z^2}}\,dx\,dy\,dz$$

==== From cylindrical coordinates ====
$$\begin{align}
\rho   &= \sqrt{r^2 + h^2} \\
\theta &= \arctan\frac{r}{h} \\
\varphi   &= \varphi \\
\frac{\partial(\rho, \theta, \varphi)}{\partial(r, h, \varphi)}
&= \begin{pmatrix}
\frac{r}{\sqrt{r^2 + h^2}} & \frac{h}{\sqrt{r^2 + h^2}} & 0  \\
\frac{h}{r^2 + h^2}        & \frac{-r}{r^2 + h^2}       & 0  \\
0                          & 0                          & 1 \\
\end{pmatrix} \\
\det \frac{\partial(\rho, \theta, \varphi)}{\partial(r, h, \varphi)}
&= \frac{1}{\sqrt{r^2+h^2}}
\end{align}$$

=== To cylindrical coordinates ===
==== From Cartesian coordinates ====
$$\begin{align}
r &= \sqrt{x^2 + y^2} \\
\theta &= \arctan{\left(\frac{y}{x}\right)} \\
z &= z \quad
\end{align}$$

$$\frac{\partial(r, \theta, h)}{\partial(x, y, z)} =
\begin{pmatrix}
\frac{x}{\sqrt{x^2 + y^2}} & \frac{y}{\sqrt{x^2 + y^2}} & 0 \\
\frac{-y}{x^2 + y^2}       & \frac{x}{x^2+y^2}          & 0 \\
0                          & 0                          & 1
\end{pmatrix}$$

==== From spherical coordinates ====
$$\begin{align}
r &= \rho \sin \varphi \\
h &= \rho \cos \varphi \\
\theta &= \theta \\
\frac{\partial(r, h, \theta)}{\partial(\rho, \varphi, \theta)}
&= \begin{pmatrix}
\sin\varphi &  \rho\cos\varphi & 0 \\
\cos\varphi & -\rho\sin\varphi & 0 \\
0        &  0            & 1 \\
\end{pmatrix} \\
\det\frac{\partial(r, h, \theta)}{\partial(\rho, \varphi, \theta)}
&= -\rho
\end{align}$$

=== Arc-length, curvature and torsion from Cartesian coordinates ===
$$\begin{align}
s &= \int_0^t \sqrt{{x'}^2 + {y'}^2 + {z'}^2}\, dt \\[3pt]
\kappa &= \frac{\sqrt{\left(z''y'-y''z'\right)^2 + \left(x''z' - z''x'\right)^2 + \left(y''x' - x''y'\right)^2}}{\left({x'}^2 + {y'}^2 + {z'}^2\right)^\frac{3}{2}} \\[3pt]
\tau &= \frac{x'''\left(y'z'' - y''z'\right) + y'''\left(x''z' - x'z''\right) + z'''\left(x'y'' - x''y'\right)}{{\left(x'y'' - x''y'\right)}^2 + {\left(x''z'- x'z''\right)}^2 + {\left(y'z'' - y''z'\right)}^2}
\end{align}$$

== See also ==
- Geographic coordinate conversion
- Transformation matrix
