= Old King's Arms =

Former tavern in London, England

The Old King's Arms was a tavern in the Strand, London, which was noted for hosting a masonic lodge which was linked to the Grand Lodge. In the 1730s it was renowned as an Enlightenment Lodge, but subsequently evolved more into a dining club.

== Masonic Lodge ==
In 1735 Lord Weymouth, at the time Grand Master of the Premier Grand Lodge of England, was elected Worshipful Master of the masonic lodge based there. Lord John Ward, an avid Freemason, joined the Lodge in 1744. He had become Grand Master in 1742.
