= The Post Man =

Newspaper

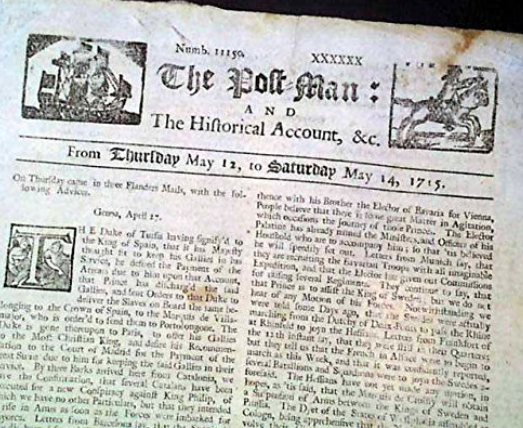
- Masthead from 12 to 14 May 1715
- Editor: Jean de Fonvive
- Founded: 1695
- Ceased publication: 1730
- Language: English
- Headquarters: London, England

The Post Man was an English newspaper published between 1695 and 1730. It was edited by Jean de Fonvive, a Huguenot refugee. It appeared three times a week and established such a reputation that the soldier, Duke of Marlborough, insisted that his military dispatches should only appear in its pages.

It was published in London.
