= Jigu Suanjing =

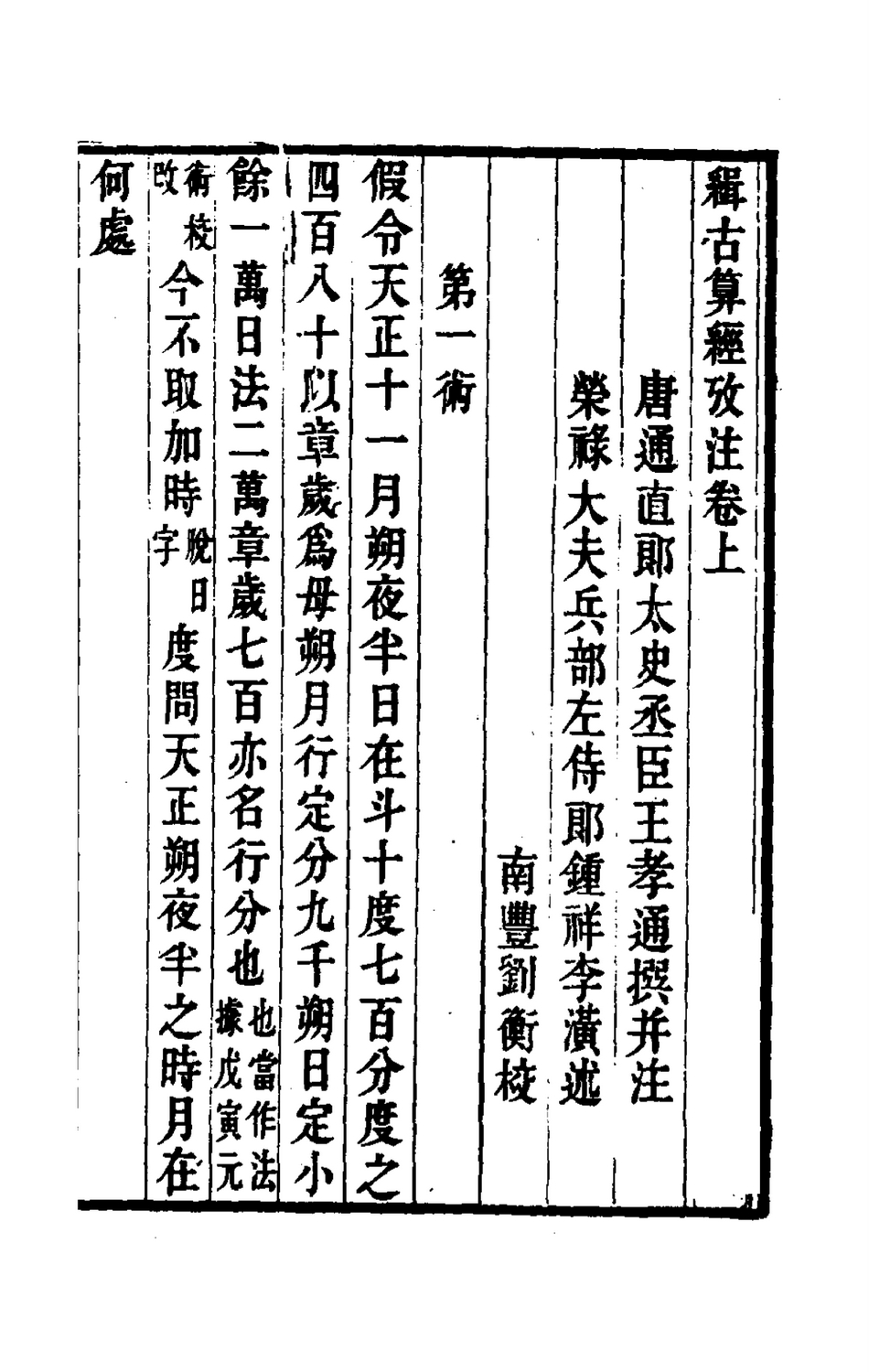
Facsimile of a Qing dynasty block printed Jigu Suanjing

Jigu suanjing (Chinese: 緝古算經, Continuation of Ancient Mathematics) was the work of early Tang dynasty calendarist and mathematician Wang Xiaotong, written some time before the year 626, when he presented his work to the Emperor. Jigu Suanjing was included as one of the requisite texts for Imperial examination; the amount of time required for the study of Jigu Suanjing was three years, the same as for The Nine Chapters on the Mathematical Art and Haidao Suanjing.

The book began with presentations to the Emperor, followed by a pursuit problem similar to the one in Jiu Zhang Suan shu, followed by thirteen three-dimensional geometry problems based mostly on engineering construction of astronomic observation tower, dike, barn, excavation of a canal bed etc., and six problems in right angled triangle plane geometry. Apart from the first problem which was solved by arithmetic, the problems deal with the solution of cubic equations, the first known Chinese work to deal with complete cubic equations, as such, it played important roles in the development for solution of high order polynomial equations in the history of Chinese mathematics. Before his time, The Nine Chapters on the Mathematical Art developed algorithm of solving simple cubic equation $x^3=N$ numerically, often referred to as the "finding the root method".

Wang Xiaotong used an algebraic method to solve three-dimensional geometry problems, and his work is a major advance in Algebra in the history of Chinese mathematics.

Each problem in Jigu Suanjing follows the same format, the question part begins with "suppose we have such and such,... question:...how many are there?"; followed by "answer:", with concrete numbers; then followed by "The algorithm says:...", in which Wang Xiaotong detailed the reasoning and procedure for the construction of equations, with a terse description of the method of solution. The emphasis of the book is on how to solve engineering problems by construction of mathematical equations from geometric properties of the relevant problem.

In Jigu Suanjin, Wang established and solved 25 cubic equations, 23 of them from problem 2 to problem 18 have the form

$$x^3+px^2+qx=N, \,$$

The remaining two problems 19, and 20 each has a double quadratic equation:

$$x^4+px^2+q=0$$

- Problem 3, two cubic equations:

$x^3+\frac{3cd}{b-c}x^2+\frac{3(a+c)hd^2}{(H-h)(b-c)}x=\frac{6Vd^2}{(H-h)(b-c)}$

$x^3+5004x^2+1169953\frac{1}{3}x=41107188\frac{1}{3}$；

- Problem 4 two cubic equations:

$$x^3+62x^2+696x=38448,\quad x=18;$$

$$x^3+594x^2=682803,\quad x=33;$$

- Problem 5

$$x^3+15x^2+66x-360,\quad x=3$$

- Problem 7:

$$x^3+(D+G)x^2+\left(DG +\frac{D^2}{3}\right)x=P-\frac{D^2G}{3}$$

$$X^+3\frac{hs}{D}x^2+3\left(\frac{hs}{D}\right)^2x=\frac{P'}{3}\frac{h^2}{D^2}$$

- Problem 8:

$$x^3+90x^2-839808,\quad x=72$$

- Problem 15:

$x^3 +\frac{S}{2}x^2-\frac{P^2}{2S}=0$。

- Problem 17:

$x^3 +\frac{5}{2}Dx^2+2D^2x = \frac{P^2}{2D} - \frac{D^2}{2}$

- Problem 20:"Suppose the long side of a right angle triangle equals to sixteen and a half, the square of the product of the short side and the hypothenuse equals to one hundred sixty four and 14 parts of 25, question, what is the length of the short side ?"

Answer: "the length of the short side is eight and four fifth."

Algorithm:"Let the square of the square of product as 'shi' (the constant term), and let the square of the long side of right angle triangle be the 'fa' (the coefficient of the y term). Solve by 'finding the root method', then find the square root again."

The algorithm is about setting up a double quadratic equation:

$x^4+\left(16\frac{1}{2}\right)^2x^2=\left(164\frac{14}{15}\right)^2$。

where x is the short side.

Wang's work influence later Chinese mathematicians, like Jia Xian and Qin Jiushao of Song dynasty.

== Editions ==
During the Tang dynasty there were hand-copied Jigu Suanjing in circulation. During the Song dynasty there were 1084 government-printed edition copies. However, by the Ming dynasty the Tang dynasty hand-copied editions and Song dynasty printed editions were almost all lost; only a single copy of a Southern Song print survived. This copy was later obtained by early Qing dynasty publisher Mao Jin, who made an image hand copy (hand-copied character by character, following the printed form closely) of it. Mao Jin's image copy of Jigu Suanjing later became the source for a printed edition during the Qianlong era and was also incorporated into the Siku Quanshu. The Qianlong era printed edition disappeared, and only Mao Jin's image copy edition of Jigu Suanjing survived at the Forbidden City Museum. The copy in the Siku Quanshu still exists.

During the Qing dynasty, study of Jigu Suangjing was in vogue; half a dozen books devoted to the study of Jigu Suanjing by mathematicians were published, some of which concentrated on filling the gaps left by many missing characters due to age, and some devoted to the detail elaboration of algorithm either from geometry point of view (Li Huang) or from Tian yuan shu (Zhang Dunren).

In 1963, Chinese mathematics historian Qian Baocong published his annotated The Ten Computational Canons, which included Jigu Suanjing.

Jigu Suanjing was introduced to the English speaking world by Alexander Wylie in his book Notes on Chinese Literature.
