= Wang Xiaotong =

Chinese mathematician (580–640)

Wang Xiaotong (王孝通) (AD 580–640), also known as Wang Hs'iao-t'ung, was a Chinese mathematician, calendarist, politician, and writer of the early Tang dynasty. He is famous as the author of the Jigu Suanjing (Continuation of Ancient Mathematics) one of the Ten Computational Canons.

He presented this work to Li Yuan, the first emperor of the Tang dynasty, along with a brief biography.

According to this autobiography, he became interested in mathematics at a young age. After a study of the Nine Chapters on the Mathematical Art and particularly Liu Hui's commentary on it, Wang became a teacher of mathematics, and later deputy director of the Astronomical Bureau.

It was known that the Chinese calendar at that time was in need of reform since, although only in operation for a few years, already predictions of eclipses were getting out of step. In 623, together with Zu Xiaosun, a Civil Servant, he was assigned to report on problems with the calendar—although only recently adopted, it was already out of step with the eclipses. In fact, Wang did not approach this in a sophisticated way; he proposed to ignore the irregularity of the sun's motion and also the precession of the equinoxes—both had already been incorporated in calendar calculations by Zu Chongzhi in the fifth century.

== Jigu Suanjing ==
His major contribution was the Jigu suanjing ("Continuation of Ancient Mathematics" 缉古算经), written before year 626. Jigu Suanjing became a text for the imperial examinations; it was included as one of the Ten Computational Canons when reprinted in 1084.

The book contains 20 problems based mostly on engineering construction of astronomic observation tower, dike, excavation of a canal bed etc. and right angled triangles, but which in essence deal with the solution of cubic equations, the first known Chinese work to deal with them.

In Jigu Suanjin, Wang established and solved 25 cubic equations of the form:

$x^3+px^2+qx=N$, along with 2 quadratic equations and 2 double quadratic equations.

Wang's work influence later Chinese mathematicians, but it is said that it was his ideas on cubic equations which influenced the Italian mathematician Fibonacci after transmission via the Islamic world.

== Sources ==
- J-C Martzloff, A history of Chinese mathematics (Berlin-Heidelberg, 1997).
- J-C Martzloff, Histoire des mathématiques chinoises (Paris, 1987).
- Y Mikami, The Development of Mathematics in China and Japan, chapter 8 Wang Hsiao-Tung and Cubic Equations, pp 53–56, reprint of 1913 ed (New York, 1974).
- B Qian (ed.), Ten Mathematical Classics (Chinese) (Beijing, 1963).
- Y Ruan, Biographies of Mathematicians and Astronomers (Chinese) 1 (Shanghai, 1955).
- K Shen, J N Crossley and A W-C Lun, The nine chapters on the mathematical art : Companion and commentary (Beijing, 1999).
