= Wucao Suanjing =

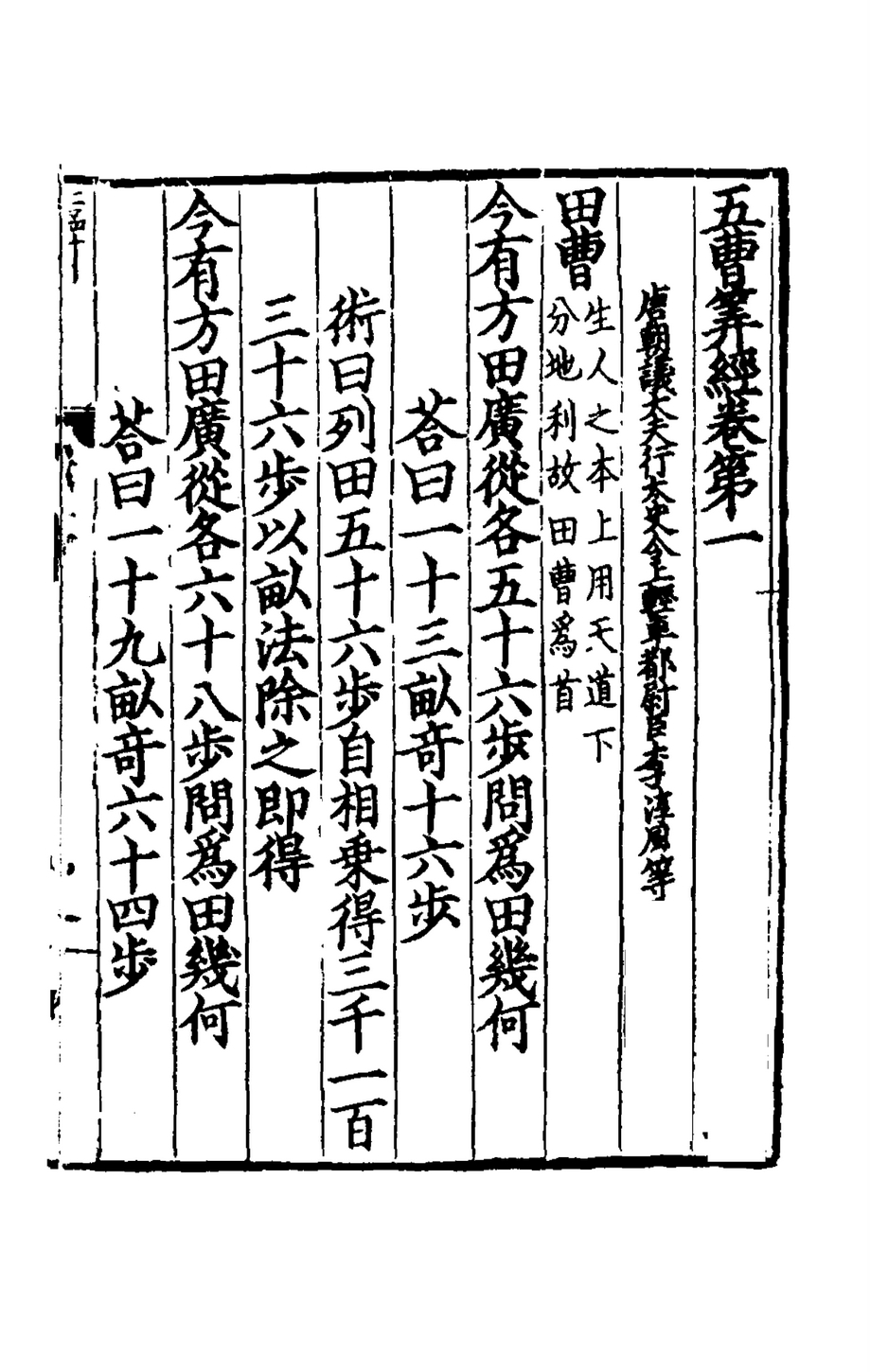
A page from Wucao Suanjing

Wucao Suanjing (五曹算經; Mathematical Manual of the Five Administrative Departments) is one of the books in the collection of mathematical texts assembled by Li Chunfeng and collectively referred to as The Ten Computational Canons by later writers. The text was designed for the teaching of those entering the five government departments of agriculture, war, accounts, granary and treasury. There is a chapter relating to each one of these departments. The text contains some formulas to find the areas of different shapes of fields. Though the formulas give approximately correct answers, they are actually incorrect. This incorrectness motivated further mathematical work. The mathematics involved does not go much beyond the processes of multiplication and division.

== An approximation formula given in Wucao suanjing ==
Wucao suanjing contains an interesting approximate formula to find the area of a quadrilateral. This formula, known as "Surveyor's Rule" appears in the ancient mathematical literature of Mesopotamia, Egypt, Europe, Arabia and India. The formula can be stated thus:

Area of a quadrilateral = (a + c)(b + d)/4 where a, b, c, d are the lengths of the sides of the quadrilateral.
