= Xu Yue =

Xu Yue may refer to:

- Xu Yue (mathematician)
- Xu Yue (footballer)
