= Wujing Suanshu =

6th-century Chinese mathematical text

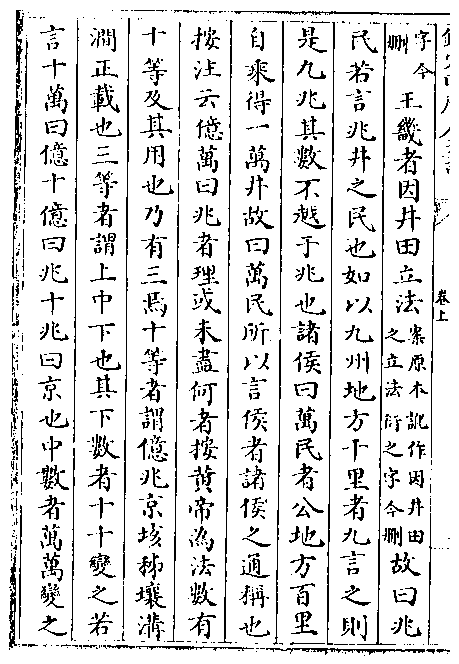
A page from Wujing Suanshu

Wujing Suanshu (五經算術; translated as Mathematical Procedures of the Five Canons or Arithmetic methods in the Five Classics) is a 6th-century Chinese mathematical text written by Zhen Luan (535 – 566). During the early Tang dynasty, the text was selected to be part of the collection Ten Computational Canons.
