= Shushu Jiyi =

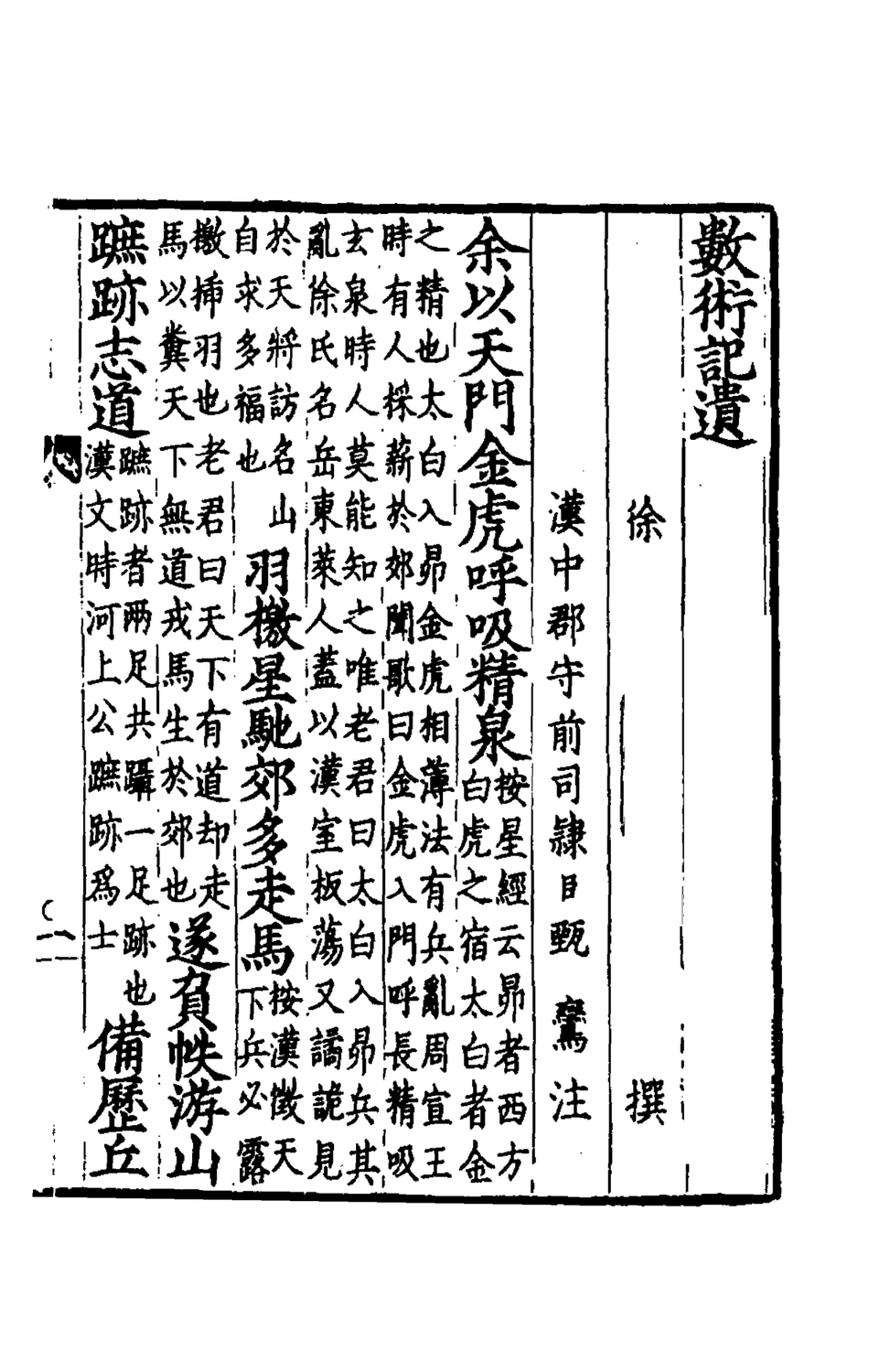
A page from the 1st volume of Shushu Jiyi

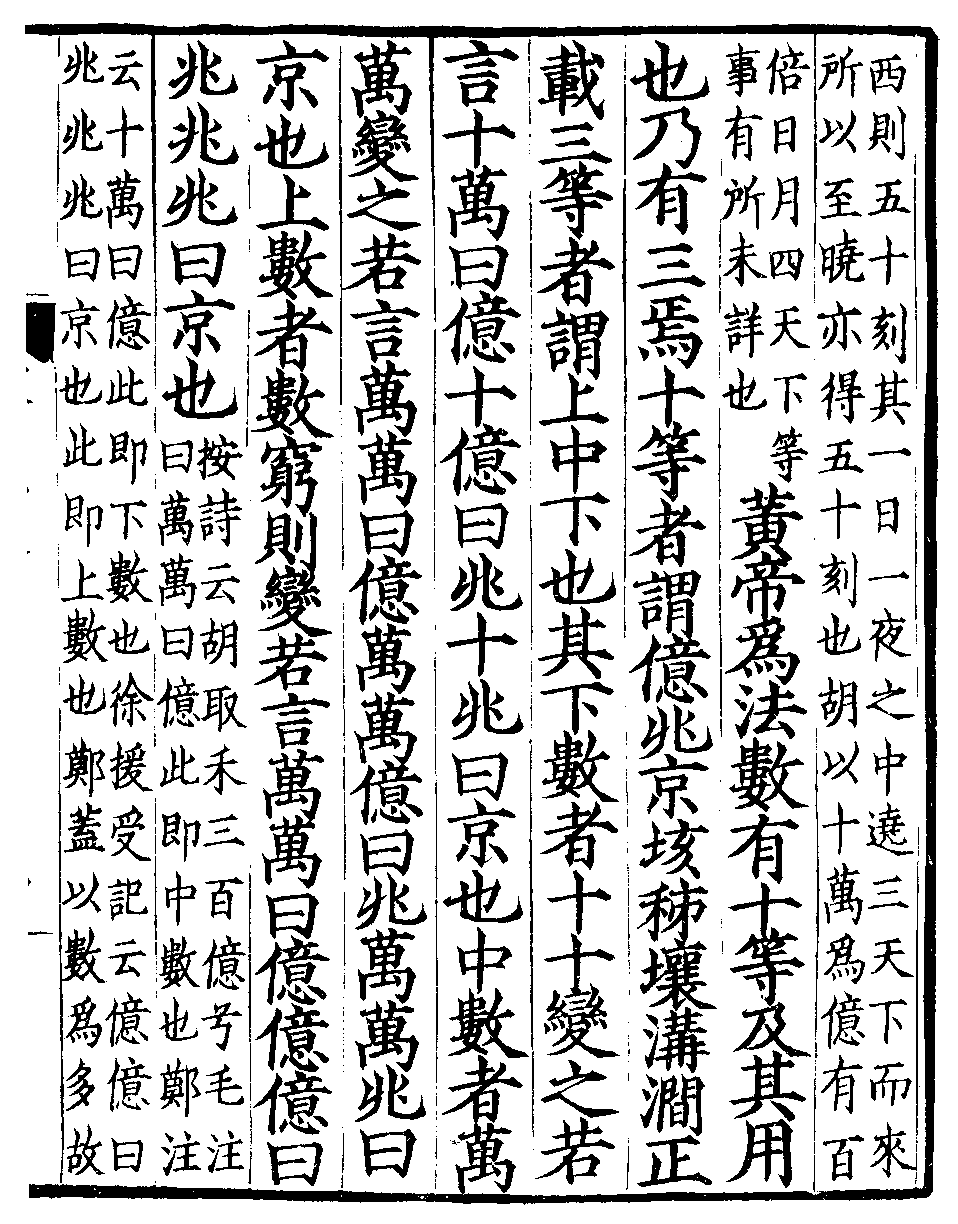
Another page of the Shushu Jiyi

Shushu Jiyi (數術記遺; translated as Notes on Traditions of Arithmetic Methods, Memoir on the Methods of Numbering or Notes on Traditions of Arithmetic Method) is a Chinese mathematical treatise written by the Eastern Han dynasty mathematician Xu Yue. The text received a subsequent commentary by Zhen Luan in the 6th century.

== Description ==
The text mentions 14 methods of calculation, and it was selected to become one of the Ten Computational Canons in the 11th century during the Song dynasty, replacing the Zhui Shu (Method of Interpolation) by Zu Chongzhi.

The earliest surviving printed edition of the text is a Southern Song printed copy from 1212, now preserved in the Peking University Library.
