= Xu Yue (mathematician) =

Chinese mathematician

Xu Yue was a second-century mathematician born in Donglai, in present-day Shandong province, China. Little is known of his life except that he was a student of Liu Hong, an astronomer, and mathematician in second-century China, and had frequent discussions with the Astronomer-Royal of the Astronomical Bureau.

== Works ==
Xu Yue wrote a commentary on Nine Chapters on Mathematical Art and a treatise, Notes on Traditions of Arithmetic Methods. The commentary has been lost, but his own work has survived with a commentary from Zhen Luan.

Notes on Traditions of Arithmetic Methods mentions 14 old methods of calculation. This book was a prescribed mathematical text for the Imperial examinations in 656 and became one of The Ten Mathematical Classics (算经十书) in 1084.
