= Xiahou Yang Suanjing =

- Traditional Chinese: 夏侯陽算經
- Simplified Chinese: 夏侯阳算经
Transcriptions

Xiahou Yang Suanjing (Xiahou Yang's Mathematical Manual) is a mathematical treatise attributed to the fifth century CE Chinese mathematician Xiahou Yang. However, some historians are of the opinion that Xiahou Yang Suanjing was not written by Xiahou Yang. It is one of the books in The Ten Computational Canons, a collection of mathematical texts assembled by Li Chunfeng and used as the official mathematical for the imperial examinations.

Though little is known about the period of the author, there is some evidence which more or less conclusively establishes the date of the work. These suggest 468 CE as the latest possible date for the work to be written and 425 CE as the earliest date.

== Contents ==
A page from the Xiahou Yang Suanjing

The treatise is divided into three parts and these are spoken of as the higher, the middle and the lower sections. The first chapter contains 19 problems, the second chapter contains 29 problems and the last chapter contains 44 problems. As in all the older Chinese books, no technical rules are given, and the problems are simply followed by the answers, occasionally with brief explanations.

=== Section 1 ===
In the first section the five operations of addition, subtraction, multiplication, division, and square and cube roots are given. The work on division is subdivided into (1) "ordinary division"; (2) "division by ten, hundred, and so on," especially intended for work in mensuration; (3) "division by simplification" (yo ch'ut). The last problem in the section is as follows:

"There are 1843 k'o, 8 t'ow, 3 ho of coarse rice. A contract requires that this be exchanged for refined rice at the rate of 1 k'o, 4 t'ow for 3 k'o. How much refined rice must be given?" The answer is 860 k'o, 534 ho. The solution is given as follows: "Multiply the given number by 1 k'o, 4 t'ow and divide by 3 k'o and you will obtain the result." (1 k'o = 10 t'ow = 100 ho)

Fractions are also mentioned, special names being given to the four most common ones, as follows:

1/2 is called chung p'an (even part)
1/3 is called shaw p'an (small part)
2/3 is called thai p'an (large part)
1/4 is called joh p'an (weak part)

=== Section 2 ===
In the second section there are twenty-eight applied problems relating to taxes, commissions, and such questions as concern the division by army officers of loot and food (silk, rice, wine, soy sauce, vinegar, and the like) among their soldiers.

=== Section 3 ===
The third section contains forty-two problems. The translations of some of these problems are given below.

1. "Now for 1 pound of gold one gets 1200 pieces of silk. How many can you get for 1 ounce?" Answer: For 1 ounce you get exactly 75 pieces. Solution: Take the given number of pieces, have it divided by 16 ounces, and you will obtain the answer. (Chinese pound was divided into 16 ounces.)
2. "Now you have 192 ounces of silk. How many choo have you?" Answer: Four thousand six hundred eight. (It appears that in obtaining the given solution to the problem, pound was divided into 24 choos.)
3. "Now 2000 packages of cash must be carried to the town at the rate of 10 cash per bundle. How much will be given to the mandarin and how much to the carrier?" Answer: 1980 packages and 198 2/101 cash to the mandarin; 19 packages and 801 98/101 to the carrier. Solution: Take the total number as the dividend, and 1 package plus 10 cash as the divisor.
4. "Out of 3485 ounces of silk how many pieces of satin can be made, 5 ounces being required for each piece?" Answer: 697. Solution: Multiply the number of ounces by 2 and go back by one row. Dividing by 5 will also give the answer.
5. "Now they build a wall, high 3 rods, broad 5 feet at the upper part and 15 feet at the lower part; the length 100 rods. For a 2-foot square a man works 1 day. How many days are required?" Answer: 75,000. Solution: Take-half the sum of the upper and lower breadths, have it multiplied by the height and length; the product will be the dividend. As the divisor you will use the square of the given 2 feet.
