= Ten Computational Canons =

The Ten Computational Canons (traditional Chinese: 算經十書; simplified Chinese: 算经十书) was a collection of ten Chinese mathematical works dating from pre-Han dynasty to early Tang dynasty, compiled by the early Tang mathematician Li Chunfeng (602–670) in the 650s, as the official mathematical texts for imperial examinations in mathematics.

== Included works ==
The Ten Computation Canons consist of ten superlative works that conveyed mathematical knowledge from the Zhou to the early Tang dynasty, a time span of over a thousand years.

The original Ten Computational Canons includes:

1. Zhoubi Suanjing (Zhou Shadow Mathematical Classic)
2. Jiuzhang Suanshu (The Nine Chapters on the Mathematical Art)
3. Haidao Suanjing (The Sea Island Mathematical Classic)
4. Sunzi Suanjing (The Mathematical Classic of Sun Zi)
5. Zhang Qiujian Suanjing (The Mathematical Classic of Zhang Qiujian)
6. Wucao Suanjing (Computational Canon of the Five Administrative Sections)
7. Xiahou Yang Suanjing (The Mathematical Classic of Xiahou Yang)
8. Wujing Suanshu (Computational Prescriptions of the Five Classics)
9. Jigu Suanjing (Continuation of Ancient Mathematical Classic)
10. Zhui Shu (Method of Interpolation)

In 1084 during the Northern Song dynasty, the text Shushu Jiyi (Notes on Traditions of Arithmetic Methods) was selected to be part of this collection, replacing Zhui Shu. Thus, Shushu Jiyi has appeared in the subsequent issuing of the catalogue.

Since the Northern Song dynasty, the catalogue consist of:

1. Zhoubi Suanjing (Zhou Shadow Mathematical Classic)
2. Jiuzhang Suanshu (The Nine Chapters on the Mathematical Art)
3. Haidao Suanjing (The Sea Island Mathematical Classic)
4. Sunzi Suanjing (The Mathematical Classic of Sun Zi)
5. Zhang Qiujian Suanjing (The Mathematical Classic of Zhang Qiujian)
6. Wucao Suanjing (Computational Canon of the Five Administrative Sections)
7. Xiahou Yang Suanjing (The Mathematical Classic of Xiahou Yang)
8. Wujing Suanshu (Computational Prescriptions of the Five Classics)
9. Jigu Suanjing (Continuation of Ancient Mathematical Classic)
10. Shushu Jiyi (Notes on Traditions of Arithmetic Methods)

== Impact ==
It was specified in Tang dynasty laws on examination that Sunzi Suanjing and the Wucao Suanjing together required one year of study; Jiuzhang Suanshu plus Haidao Suanjing three years; Jigu Suanjing three years; Zhui Shu four years; and Zhang Qiujian and Xia Houyang one year each.

The government of the Song dynasty actively promoted the study of mathematics. There were two government xylograph editions of The Ten Computational Canons in the years 1084 and 1213. The wide availability of these mathematical texts contributed to the flourishing of mathematics in the Song and Yuan dynasties, inspiring mathematicians such as Jia Xian, Qin Jiushao, Yang Hui, Li Zhi and Zhu Shijie.

In the Ming dynasty during the reign of the Yongle Emperor, the Ten Computational Canons were copied into the Yongle Encyclopedia. During the reign of the Qianlong Emperor in the Qing dynasty, scholar Dai Zhen made copies of the Ten Computational Canons including the Shushu Jiyi from the Yongle Encyclopedia and transferred them into another encyclopedia, the Complete Library of the Four Treasuries.

== Gallery ==
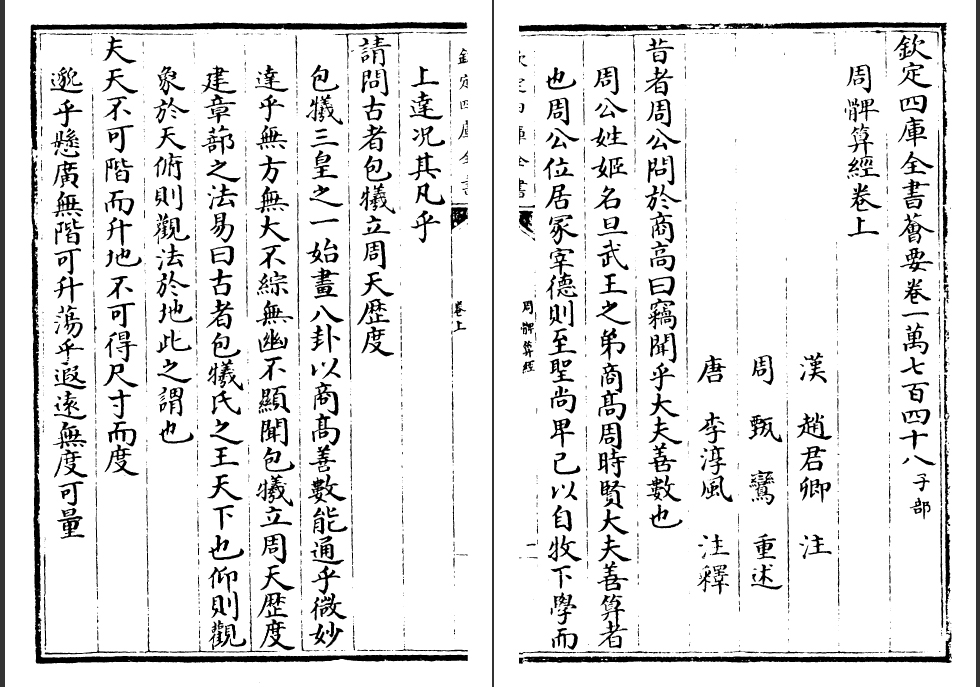
Zhoubi Suanjing (Zhou Shadow Mathematical Classic)

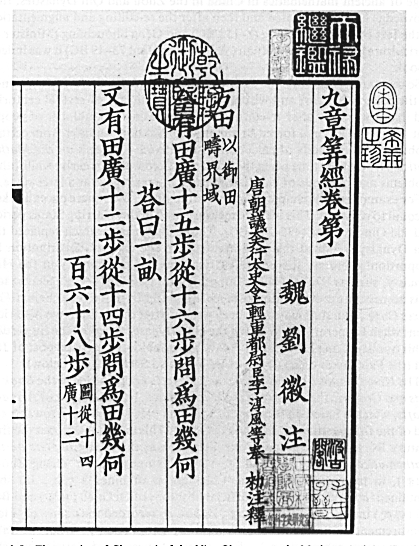
Jiuzhang Suanshu (The Nine Chapters on the Mathematical Art)

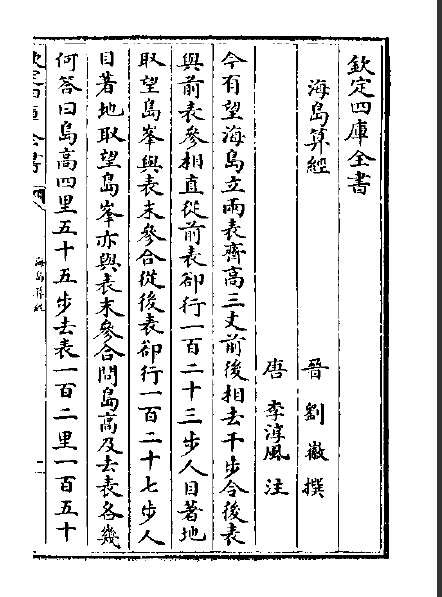
Haidao Suanjing (The Sea Island Mathematical Classic)

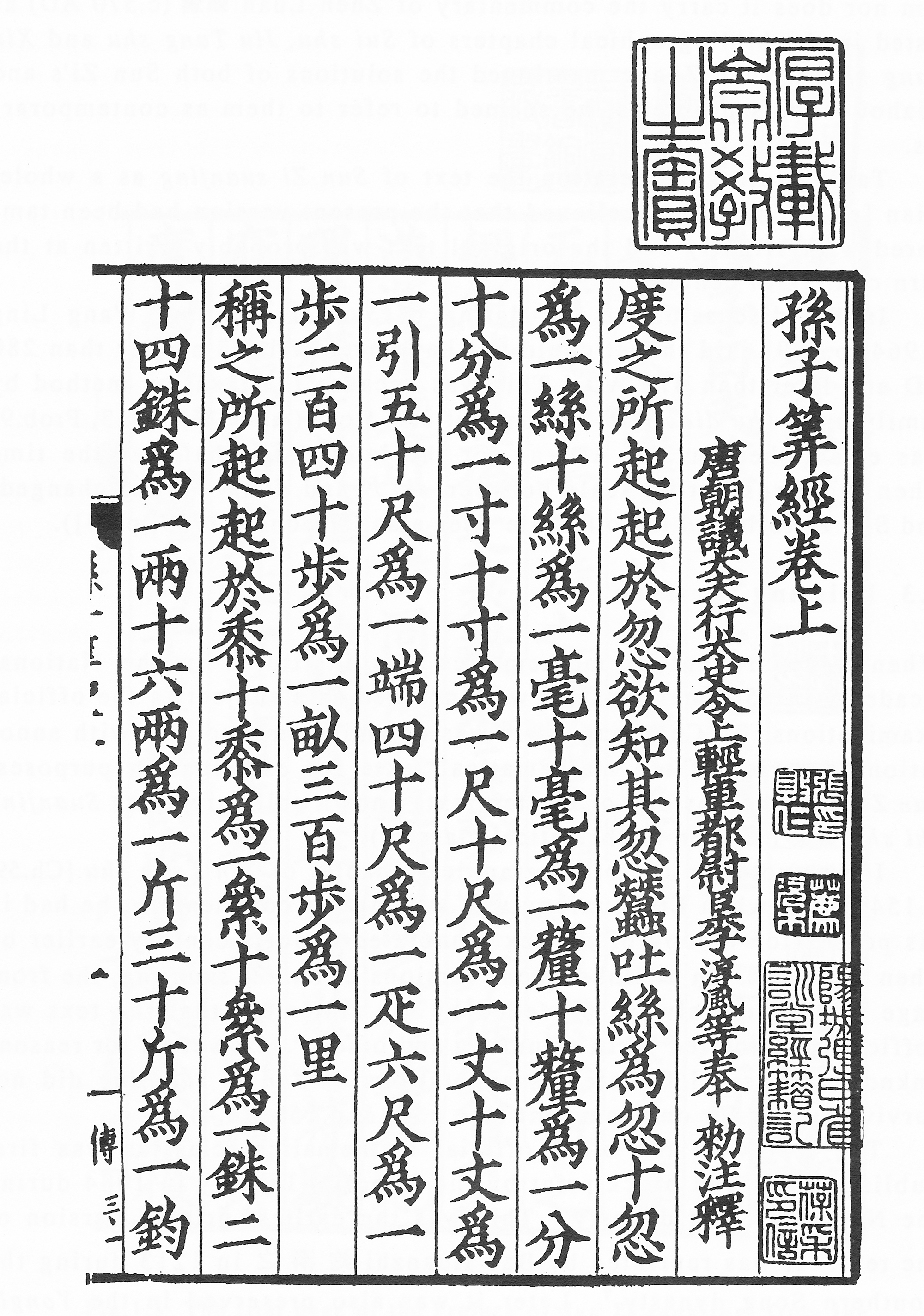
Sunzi Suanjing (The Mathematical Classic of Sun Zi)

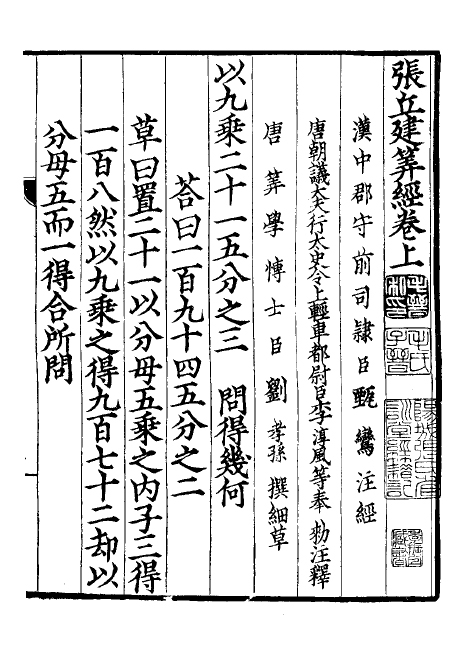
Zhang Qiujian Suanjing (The Mathematical Classic of Zhang Qiujian)

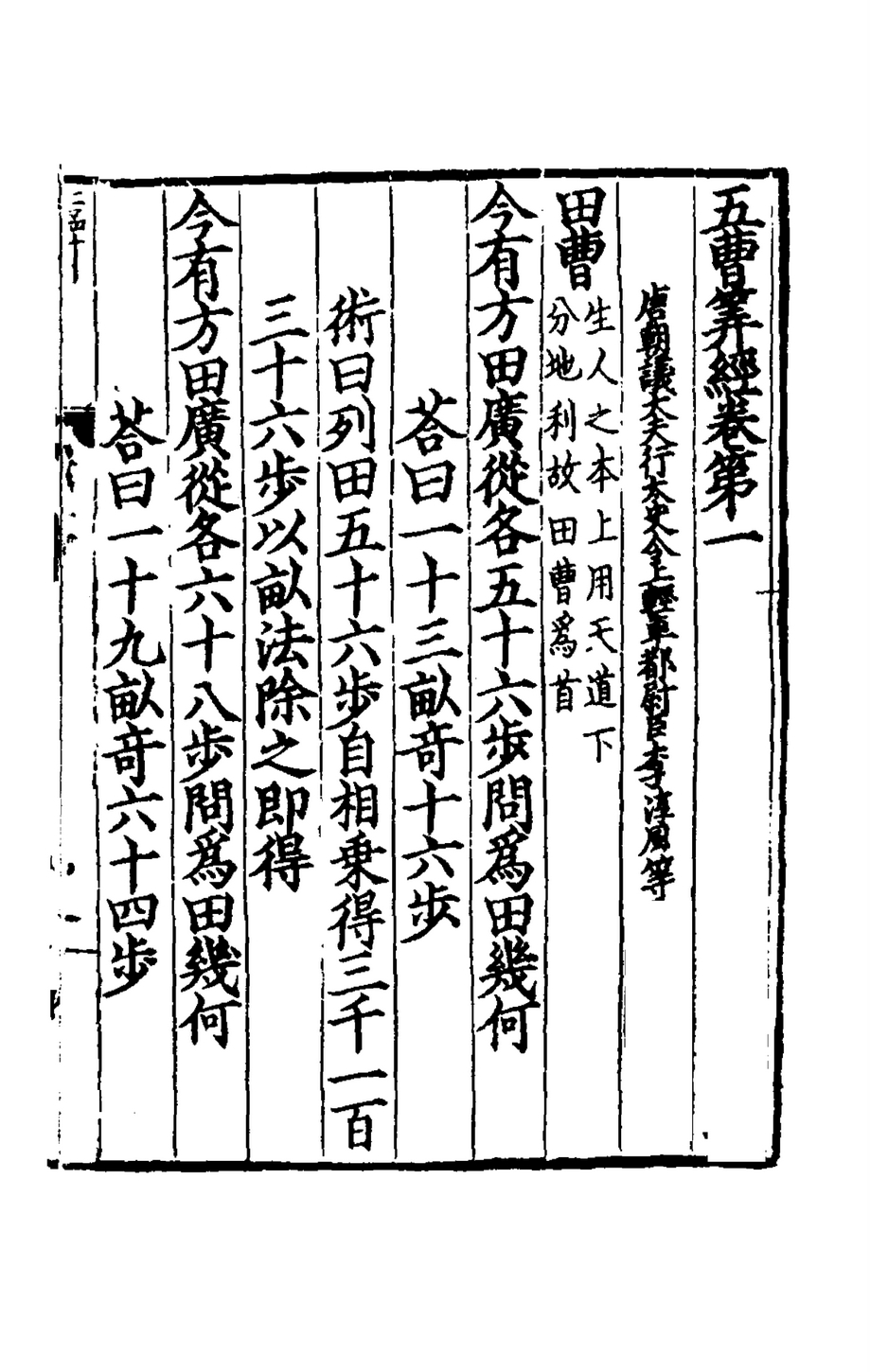
Wucao Suanjing (Computational Canon of the Five Administrative Sections)

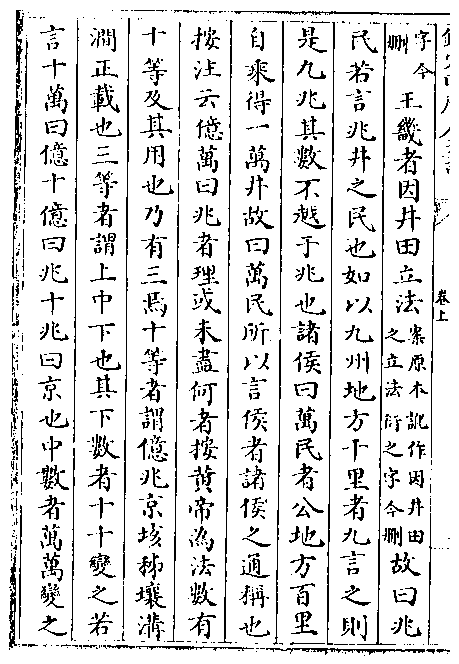
Wujing Suanshu (Computational Prescriptions of the Five Classics)

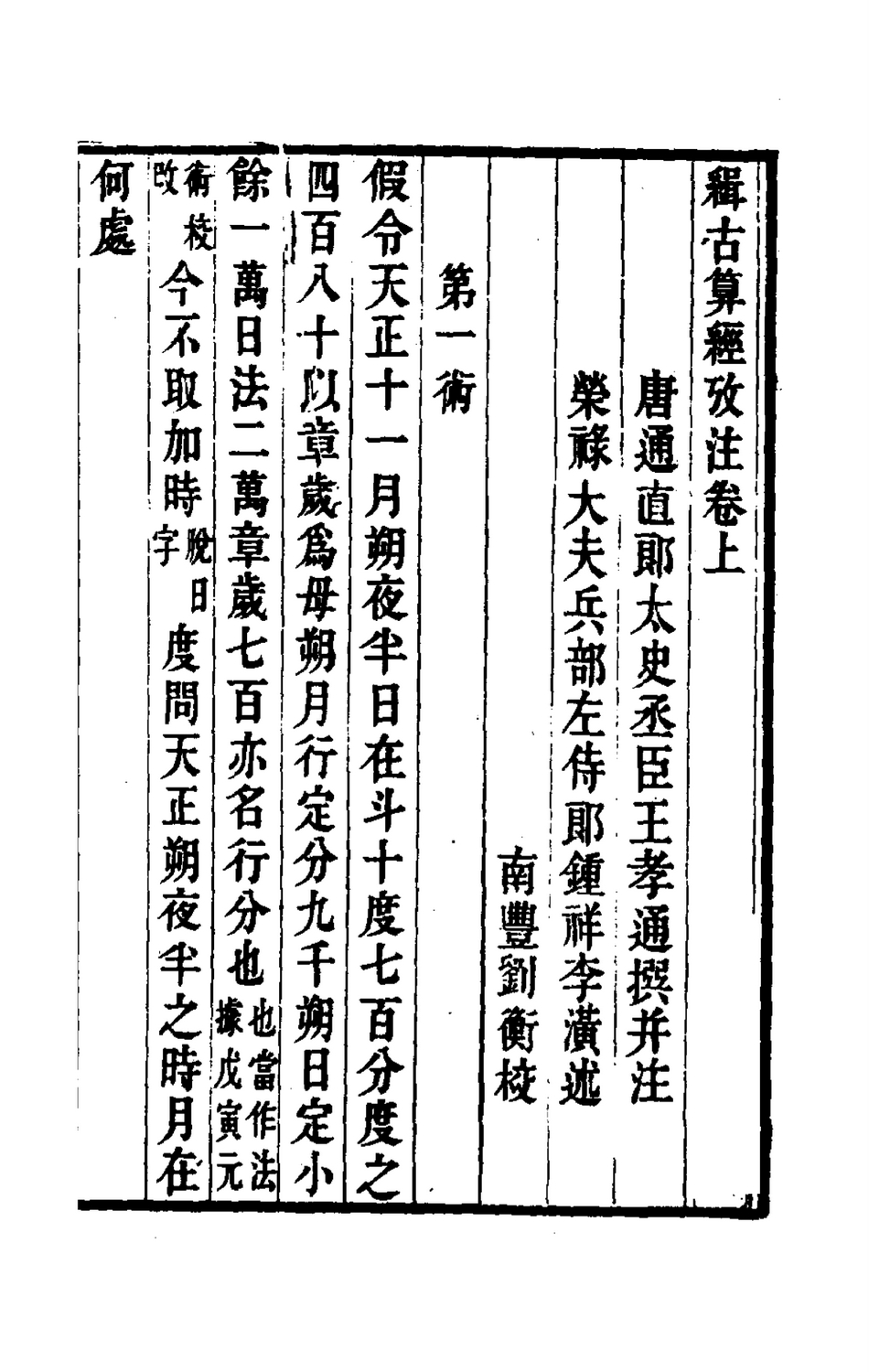
Jigu Suanjing (Continuation of Ancient Mathematical Classic)

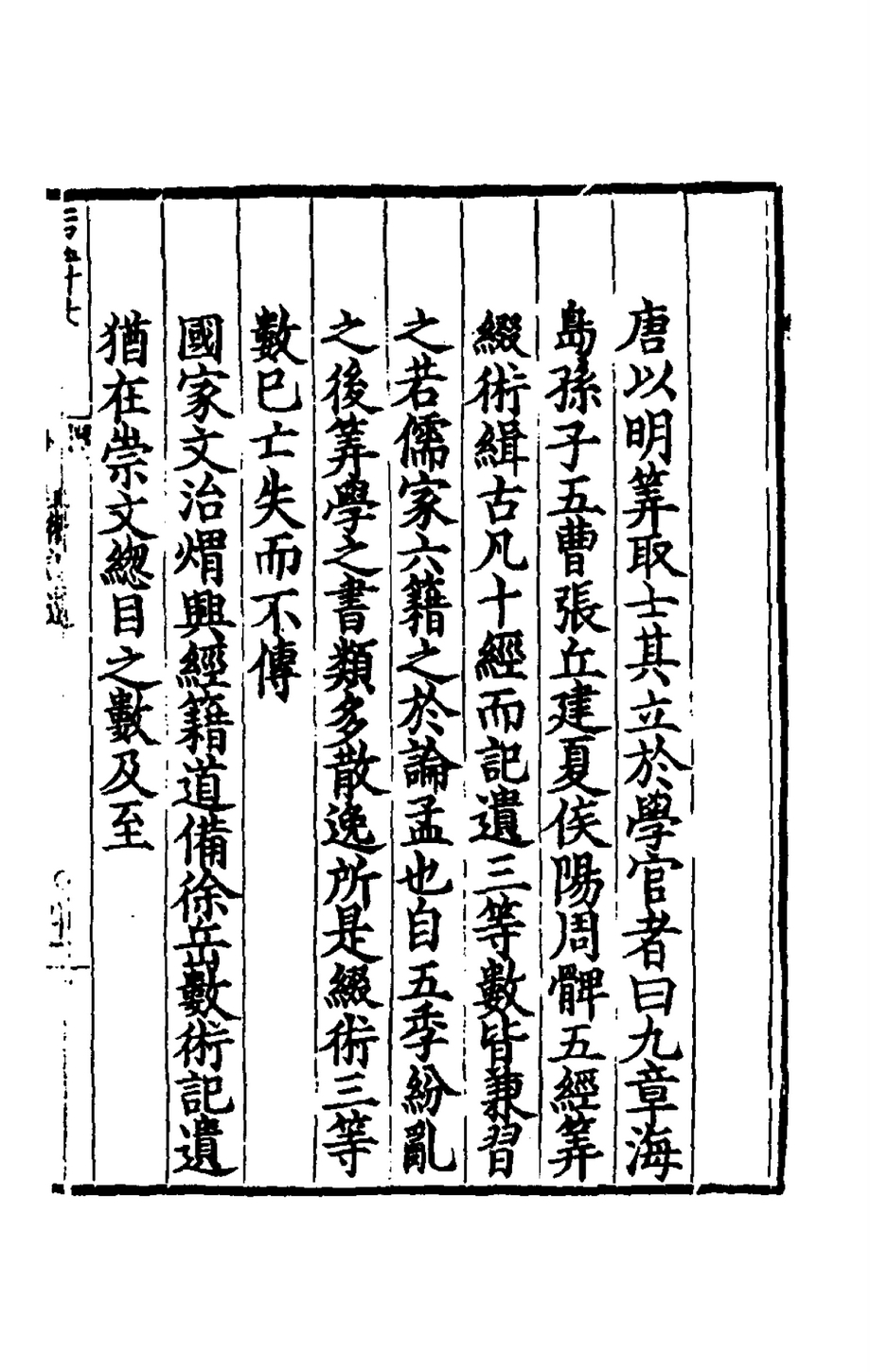
Shushu Jiyi (Notes on Traditions of Arithmetic Methods)
