= Li Chunfeng =

Chinese astronomer and historian (602–670)

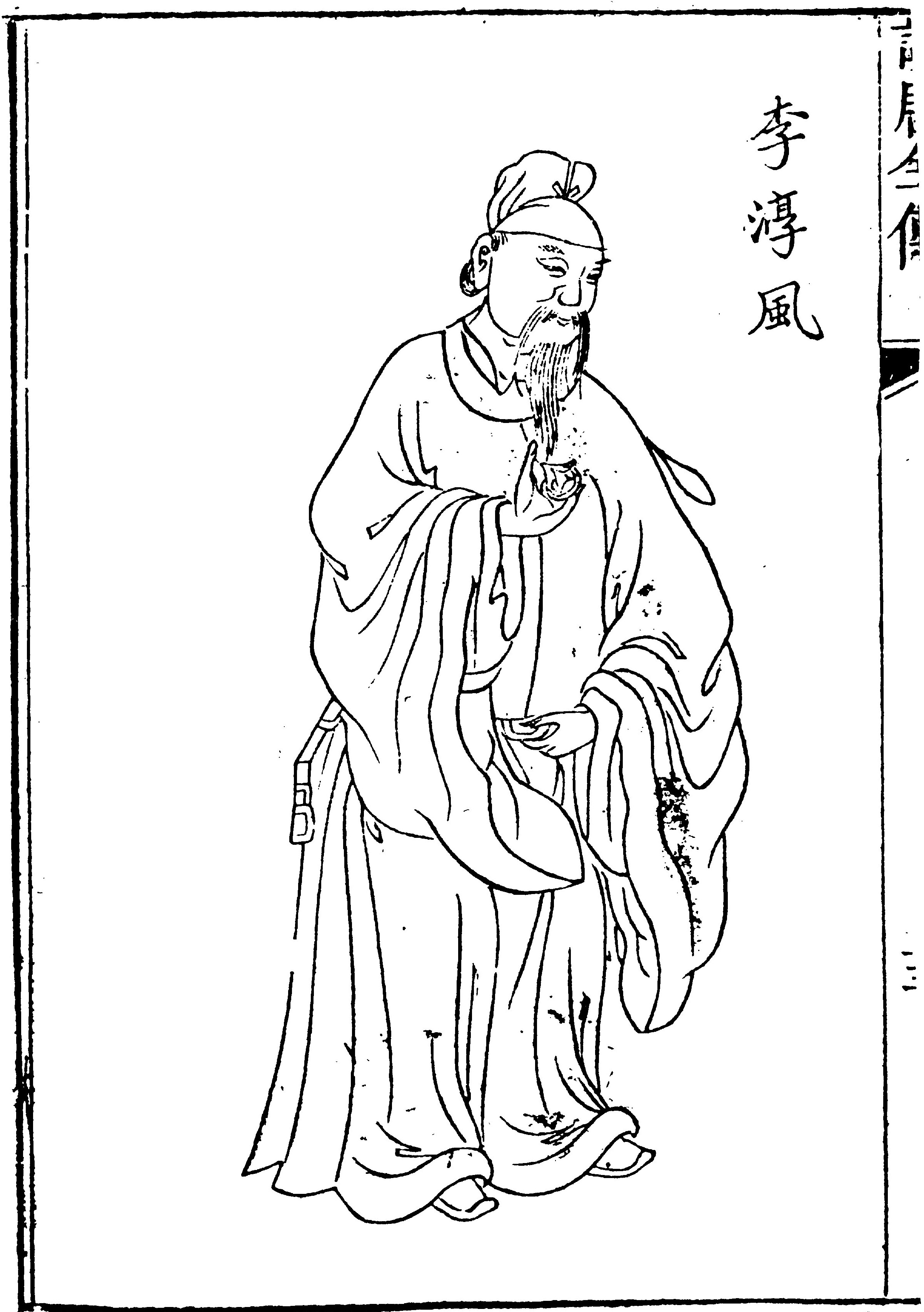
Li Chunfeng

Li Chunfeng (simplified Chinese: 李淳风; traditional Chinese: 李淳風; pinyin: Lǐ Chúnfēng; Wade–Giles: Li Ch'un-feng; 602–670) was a Chinese astronomer, mathematician, historian, and official of the early Tang dynasty, born in present-day Baoji, Shaanxi. He served as director of the Imperial Astronomical Bureau, reformed the calendar, annotated the classical Chinese mathematical canon, and co-compiled the astronomical and calendrical treatises of the official Tang histories.

== Background and career ==
Li was born in 602 during the Sui dynasty and witnessed the fall of that dynasty and the rise of the Tang at the age of sixteen. In recognition of his scholarly achievements, Li was appointed to a position within the Imperial Astronomy Bureau in 627, marking a significant milestone in his career as a court astronomer and historian. He was promoted to deputy director of the Imperial Astronomy Bureau in 641 and to director in 648. He was appointed partly because of his critique of the Wuyin calendar, which had been failing to predict eclipses accurately. Eclipse prediction was a matter of high political importance in the Chinese tradition because of the doctrine of the Mandate of Heaven: an emperor's ability to foretell and explain celestial events was understood as evidence of the legitimacy of his rule. Li died in Chang'an in 670.

== Astronomy and calendar ==
Li's most prominent achievement was the Linde calendar (麟德曆), introduced in 665. It improved the prediction of planetary positions and included an intercalary month — analogous to a leap day — added periodically to reconcile the lunar and solar years.

Li also wrote a document criticising the outdated equipment in the Imperial Astronomy Bureau, and was subsequently commanded to construct a new armillary sphere, which he completed in 633. His construction incorporated an additional third ring beyond the standard two-ring design.

== Mathematics ==
Li and his collaborators Liang Shu and Wang Zhenru compiled and annotated the collection known as the Ten Mathematical Manuals (十部算經, Shibu Suanjing), a set of ten classical mathematical texts submitted to the emperor in 656, which became the standard curriculum for Tang state mathematics education.

Li also corrected certain mathematical works. In his commentary on the Nine Chapters on the Mathematical Art, he demonstrated that the least common multiple of the integers 2 through 12 is 27720, correcting a flawed result in the original text.

The famous result that π lies between 3.1415926 and 3.1415927, and the approximation 355/113, were the work of Zu Chongzhi (429–501), whose Zhui Shu is now lost. It was Li Chunfeng who preserved this calculation by recording Zu's result in his commentary on the Book of Sui, praising Zu as the most accomplished mathematician of his time. Li's own annotation on the same passage gives 22/7 (≈ 3.14286) as a working approximation, while noting Zu's far more precise bounds. Li began each annotation with the words "Your servant, Chunfeng, and his collaborators comment respectfully on…".

== Literary works ==
Li contributed the treatises on astrology, metrology, and music to the Book of Sui and Book of Jin, which are among the official histories of those periods.

Around 645 Li wrote the Yisi zhan (乙巳占), a treatise on astrological and meteorological divination gathering earlier theoretical material. In this work he cautioned that natural phenomena are too complex for astrological prediction to be fully reliable.

Li also wrote the Ganying jing (感應經) circa 640, elaborating the concept of ganying (cosmic correspondence).

The prophetic work Tui bei tu ("Back-Pushing Illustrations") is traditionally attributed to Li Chunfeng together with Yuan Tiangang, but this attribution is regarded by modern scholars as a later legend; surviving versions of the text are substantially later in date.

== See also ==
- Ten Computational Canons

== Sources ==
- Ho, Peng Yoke (1985). Li, Qi and Shu: An Introduction to Science and Civilization in China. Hong Kong University Press. ISBN 0-295-96362-X.
- Martzloff, Jean-Claude (1997). A History of Chinese Mathematics. Springer. ISBN 978-3-540-54749-5.
- Needham, Joseph; Wang, Ling (1995) [1959]. Science and Civilisation in China: Volume 3, Mathematics and the Sciences of the Heavens and the Earth. Cambridge, England: Cambridge University Press. p. 30. ISBN 978-0-521-05801-8.
- Sivin, Nathan (2009). Granting the Seasons: The Chinese Astronomical Reform of 1280. Springer. ISBN 978-0-387-78955-2.

== Bibliography ==
- Zhuang, Tianshan, "Li Chunfeng". Encyclopedia of China (Astronomy Edition), 1st ed.
- Encyclopædia Britannica
