= The Nine Chapters on the Mathematical Art =

Ancient Chinese mathematics text

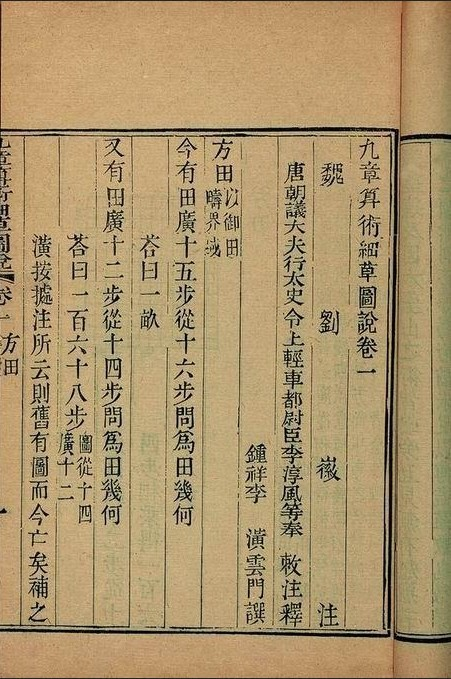
- A page of The Nine Chapters on the Mathematical Art (1820 edition)
- Traditional Chinese: 九章算術
- Simplified Chinese: 九章算术
- Literal meaning: nine chapters on arithmetic
Transcriptions
Standard Mandarin
- Hanyu Pinyin: Jiǔ Zhāng Suànshù
- Wade–Giles: Chiu^{3} Chang^{1} Suan^{4}-shu^{4}
Middle Chinese
- Middle Chinese: /kɨu^{X} t͡ɕɨɐŋ suɑn^{X} ʑiuɪt̚/
Old Chinese
- Zhengzhang: /kuʔ kjaŋ sloːnʔ ɦljud/

The Nine Chapters on the Mathematical Art is a Chinese mathematics book, composed by several generations of scholars from the 10th–2nd century BCE, its latest stage being from the 1st century CE. This book is one of the earliest surviving mathematical texts from China, the others being the Suan shu shu (202 BCE – 186 BCE) and Zhoubi Suanjing (compiled throughout the Han until the late 2nd century CE). It lays out an approach to mathematics that centres on finding the most general methods of solving problems, which may be contrasted with the approach common to ancient Greek mathematicians, who tended to deduce propositions from an initial set of assumptions called axioms.

Entries in the book usually take the form of a statement of a problem, followed by the statement of the solution and an explanation of the procedure that led to the solution. These were commented on by Liu Hui in the 3rd century.

The book was later included in the early Tang collection, the Ten Computational Canons.

== History ==
=== Original book ===
The full title of The Nine Chapters on the Mathematical Art appears on two bronze standard measures which are dated to 179 CE, but there is speculation that the same book existed beforehand under different titles.

The title is also mentioned in volume 24 of the Book of the Later Han as one of the books studied by Ma Xu (馬續). Based on the known dates of his younger brother Ma Rong (馬融) this places the date of composition no later than 93 CE.

Most scholars believe that Chinese mathematics and the mathematics of the ancient Mediterranean world had developed more or less independently up to the time when The Nine Chapters reached its final form. The method of chapter 7 was not found in Europe until the 13th century, and the method of chapter 8 uses Gaussian elimination before Carl Friedrich Gauss (1777–1855). There is also the mathematical proof given in the treatise for the Pythagorean theorem. The influence of The Nine Chapters greatly assisted the development of ancient mathematics in the regions of Korea and Japan. Its influence on mathematical thought in China persisted until the Qing dynasty era.

Liu Hui wrote a detailed commentary in 263. He analyses the procedures of The Nine Chapters step by step, in a manner which is clearly designed to give the reader confidence that they are reliable, although he is not concerned to provide formal proofs in the Euclidean manner. Liu's commentary is of great mathematical interest in its own right. Liu credits the earlier mathematicians Zhang Cang (fl. 165 BCE – d. 142 BCE) and Geng Shouchang (fl. 75 BCE – 49 BCE) (see armillary sphere) with the initial arrangement and commentary on the book, yet Han dynasty records do not indicate the names of any authors of commentary, as they are not mentioned until the 3rd century

The Nine Chapters is an anonymous work, and its origins are not clear. Until recent years, there was no substantial evidence of related mathematical writing that might have preceded it, with the exception of mathematical work by those such as Jing Fang (78–37 BCE), Liu Xin (d. 23), and Zhang Heng (78–139) and the geometry clauses of the Mozi of the 4th century BCE. This is no longer the case. The Suàn shù shū (算數書) or Writings on Reckonings is an ancient Chinese text on mathematics approximately seven thousand characters in length, written on 190 bamboo strips. It was discovered together with other writings in 1983 when archaeologists opened a tomb in Hubei province. It is among the corpus of texts known as the Zhangjiashan Han bamboo texts. From documentary evidence this tomb is known to have been closed in 186 BCE, early in the Western Han dynasty. While its relationship to The Nine Chapters is still under discussion by scholars, some of its contents are clearly paralleled there. The text of the Suàn shù shū is however much less systematic than The Nine Chapters; and appears to consist of a number of more or less independent short sections of text drawn from a number of sources. The Zhoubi Suanjing, a mathematics and astronomy text, was also compiled during the Han, and was even mentioned as a school of mathematics in and around 180 CE by Cai Yong.

=== Western translations ===
The title of the book has been translated in a wide variety of ways.

In 1852, Alexander Wylie referred to it as Arithmetical Rules of the Nine Sections.

With only a slight variation, the Japanese historian of mathematics Yoshio Mikami shortened the title to Arithmetic in Nine Sections.

David Eugene Smith, in his History of Mathematics (Smith 1923), followed the convention used by Yoshio Mikami.

Several years later, George Sarton took note of the book, but only with limited attention and only mentioning the usage of red and black rods for positive and negative numbers.

In 1959, Joseph Needham and Wang Ling (historian) translated Jiu Zhang Suan shu as The Nine Chapters on the Mathematical Art for the first time.

Later in 1994, Lam Lay Yong used this title in her overview of the book, as did other mathematicians including John N. Crossley and Anthony W.-C Lun in their translation of Li Yan and Du Shiran's Chinese Mathematics: A Concise History (Li and Du 1987).

Afterwards, the name The Nine Chapters on the Mathematical Art stuck and became the standard English title for the book.

== Table of contents ==
Contents of The Nine Chapters are as follows:

chapter	contents
方田 Fangtian; Bounding fields	Areas of fields of various shapes, such as rectangles, triangles, trapezoids, and circles; manipulation of vulgar fractions. Liu Hui's commentary includes a method for calculation of π and the approximate value of 3.14159.
粟米 Sumi; Millet and rice	Exchange of commodities at different rates; unit pricing; the Rule of Three for solving proportions, using fractions.
衰分 Cuifen; Proportional distribution	Distribution of commodities and money at proportional rates; deriving arithmetic and geometric sums.
少廣 Shaoguang; Reducing dimensions	Finding the diameter or side of a shape given its volume or area. Division by mixed numbers; extraction of square and cube roots; diameter of sphere, perimeter and diameter of circle.
商功 Shanggong; Figuring for construction	Volumes of solids of various shapes.
均輸 Junshu; Equitable taxation	More advanced word problems on proportion, involving work, distances, and rates.
盈不足 Yingbuzu; Excess and deficit	Linear problems (in two unknowns) solved using the principle known later in the West as the rule of false position.
方程 Fangcheng; The two-sided reference (i.e. Equations)	Problems of agricultural yields and the sale of animals that lead to systems of linear equations, solved by a principle indistinguishable from the modern form of Gaussian elimination.
勾股 Gougu; Base and altitude	Problems involving the principle known in the West as the Pythagorean theorem.

== Major contributions ==
=== Real number system ===
The Nine Chapters on the Mathematical Art does not discuss natural numbers, that is, positive integers and their operations, but they are widely used and written on the basis of natural numbers. Although it is not a book on fractions, the meaning, nature, and four operations of fractions are fully discussed. For example: combined division (addition), subtraction (subtraction), multiplication (multiplication), warp division (division), division (comparison size), reduction (simplified fraction), and bisector (average).

The concept of negative numbers also appears in "Nine Chapters of Arithmetic". In order to cooperate with the algorithm of equations, the rules of addition and subtraction of positive and negative numbers are given. The subtraction is "divide by the same name, benefit by different names. The addition is "divide by different names, benefit from each other by the same name. Among them, "division" is subtraction, "benefit" is addition, and "no entry" means that there is no counter-party, but multiplication and division are not recorded.

The Nine Chapters on the Mathematical Art gives a certain discussion on natural numbers, fractions, positive and negative numbers, and some special irrationality. Generally speaking, it has the prototype of the real number system used in modern mathematics.

=== Gou Gu (Pythagorean) Theorem ===
The geometric figures included in The Nine Chapters on the Mathematical Art are mostly straight and circular figures because of its focus on the applications onto the agricultural fields. In addition, due to the needs of civil architecture, The Nine Chapters on the Mathematical Art also discusses volumetric algorithms of linear and circular 3 dimensional solids. The arrangement of these volumetric algorithms ranges from simple to complex, forming a unique mathematical system.

Regarding the direct application of the Gou Gu Theorem, which is precisely the Chinese version of the Pythagorean Theorem, the book divides it into four main categories: Gou Gu mutual seeking, Gou Gu integer, Gou Gu dual capacity, Gou Gu similar.

Gou Gu mutual seeking discusses the algorithm of finding the length of a side of the right triangle while knowing the other two. Gou Gu integer is precisely the finding of some significant integer Pythagorean numbers, including famously the triple 3,4,5. Gou Gu dual capacity discusses algorithms for calculating the areas of the inscribed rectangles and other polygons in the circle, which also serves an algorithm to calculate the value of pi. Lastly, Gou Gu similars provide algorithms of calculating heights and lengths of buildings on the mathematical basis of similar right triangles.

=== Completing of squares and solutions of system of equations ===
The methods of completing the squares and cubes as well as solving simultaneous linear equations listed in The Nine Chapters on the Mathematical Art can be regarded one of the major content of ancient Chinese mathematics. The discussion of these algorithms in The Nine Chapters on the Mathematical Art are very detailed. Through these discussions, one can understand the achievements of the development of ancient Chinese mathematics.

Completing the squaring and cubes can not only solve systems of two linear equations with two unknowns, but also general quadratic and cubic equations. It is the basis for solving higher-order equations in ancient China, and it also plays an important role in the development of mathematics.

The "equations" discussed in the Fang Cheng chapter are equivalent to today's simultaneous linear equations. The solution method called "Fang Cheng Shi" is best known today as Gaussian elimination. Among the eighteen problems listed in the Fang Cheng chapter, some are equivalent to simultaneous linear equations with two unknowns, some are equivalent to simultaneous linear equations with 3 unknowns, and the most complex example analyzes the solution to a system of linear equations with up to 5 unknowns.

== Significance ==
The word jiu, or "9", means more than just a digit in ancient Chinese. In fact, since it is the largest digit, it often refers to something of a grand scale or a supreme authority. Further, the word zhang, or "chapter", also has more connotations than simply being the "chapter". It may refer to a section, several parts of an article, or an entire treatise.

In this light, many scholars of the history of Chinese mathematics compare the significance of The Nine Chapters on the Mathematical Art on the development of Eastern mathematical traditions to that of Euclid's Elements on the Western mathematical traditions. However, the influence of The Nine Chapters on the Mathematical Art stops short at the advancement of modern mathematics due to its focus on practical problems and inductive proof methods as opposed to the deductive, axiomatic tradition that Euclid's Elements establishes.

However, it is dismissive to say that The Nine Chapters on the Mathematical Art has no impact at all on modern mathematics. The style and structure of The Nine Chapters on the Mathematical Art can be best concluded as "problem, formula, and computation". This process of solving applied mathematical problems can now be considered the standard approach in the field of applied mathematics.

== Notable translations ==
- Abridged English translation: Yoshio Mikami: "Arithmetic in Nine Sections", in The Development of Mathematics in China and Japan, 1913.
- Highly Abridged English translation: Florian Cajori: "Arithmetic in Nine Sections", in A History of Mathematics, Second Edition, 1919 (possibly copied or paraphrased from Mikami).
- Abridged English translation: Lam Lay Yong: Jiu Zhang Suanshu: An Overview, Archive for History of Exact Sciences, Springer Verlag, 1994.
- A full translation and study of the Nine Chapters and Liu Hui's commentary is available in Kangshen Shen, The Nine Chapters on the Mathematical Art, Oxford University Press, 1999. ISBN 0-19-853936-3
- A French translation with detailed scholarly addenda and a critical edition of the Chinese text of both the book and its commentary by Karine Chemla and Shuchun Guo is Les neuf chapitres: le classique mathématique de la Chine ancienne et ses commentaires. Paris: Dunod, 2004. ISBN 978-2-10-049589-4.
- German translation: Kurt Vogel, Neun Bücher Arithmetischer Technik, Friedrich Vieweg und Sohn Braunsweig, 1968.
- Russian translation: E. I Beriozkina, Математика в девяти книгах (Mathematika V Devyati Knigah), Moscow: GITTL, 1957.

== See also ==
- Haidao Suanjing
- History of mathematics
- History of geometry
