= Hong Jeong-ha =

Korean mathematician (born 1684)

Hong Jeong-ha (Korean: 홍정하; Hanja: 洪正夏; RR: Hong Jeongha; MR: Hong Chŏngha; born 1684, date of death unknown) was a Korean mathematician of the Joseon period. His book Guiljip (구일집, 九一集) contained the most advanced results of its time on setting up and solving equations, and he has been called the greatest mathematician of Joseon.

== Family and career ==
Hong belonged to the Namyang Hong clan, and his courtesy name was Yeogwang. In Joseon, mathematics was the work of government accountants from the chungin class, who were chosen by a special mathematics examination. Hong's family dominated this field: of the 110 members of the Namyang Hong clan who passed the examination, 100 came from his line. Through marriage, his family was also linked to the families of the mathematicians Gyeong Seon-jing and Yi Sang-hyeok, and the three families probably shared mathematical knowledge. Records list 1,626 people who passed the examination between the late 15th century and 1888, but only these three men wrote books on mathematics.

Hong passed the examination in 1706. He became an instructor (hundo) in 1718 and a professor (gyosu) in 1720.

== Meeting with He Guozhu ==
In 1713, Hong and his fellow mathematician Yu Su-seok met He Guozhu, a mathematician from Qing China, and discussed mathematics with him. Their conversation is recorded in a miscellany at the end of Guiljip. He Guozhu later checked the calculations for the Qing mathematical compendium Lüli yuanyuan (1722), which included the Shuli jingyun. That Hong, then a low-ranking official, was able to meet him suggests that his skill was already well known.

Hong easily solved the problems He Guozhu set him. He set up equations using the "celestial element" method (tian yuan shu) and solved them by numerical root extraction. In practice, however, the two men could barely discuss mathematics with each other. He Guozhu did not know the celestial element method or how to calculate with counting rods, and Hong did not know Western mathematics such as trigonometry. He Guozhu and a colleague who also took part in the meeting may later have passed knowledge of the Korean method to the Qing mathematician Mei Juecheng.

== Guiljip ==
Hong based Guiljip on just three Chinese books: the Suanxue qimeng of Zhu Shijie, the Yang Hui suanfa and the Suanfa tongzong. From these, he was able to complete the mathematics of the Song and Yuan periods. He did not deal with systems of equations of higher degree, but his theories of right triangles and of equations were highly advanced, and he also worked on number theory.

Guiljip influenced later Korean mathematics. Its ideas appear in the study of the Suanxue qimeng by the 19th-century mathematicians Yi Sang-hyeok and Nam Byeong-gil.
