= Jade Mirror of the Four Unknowns =

1303 mathematical monograph by Zhu Shijie

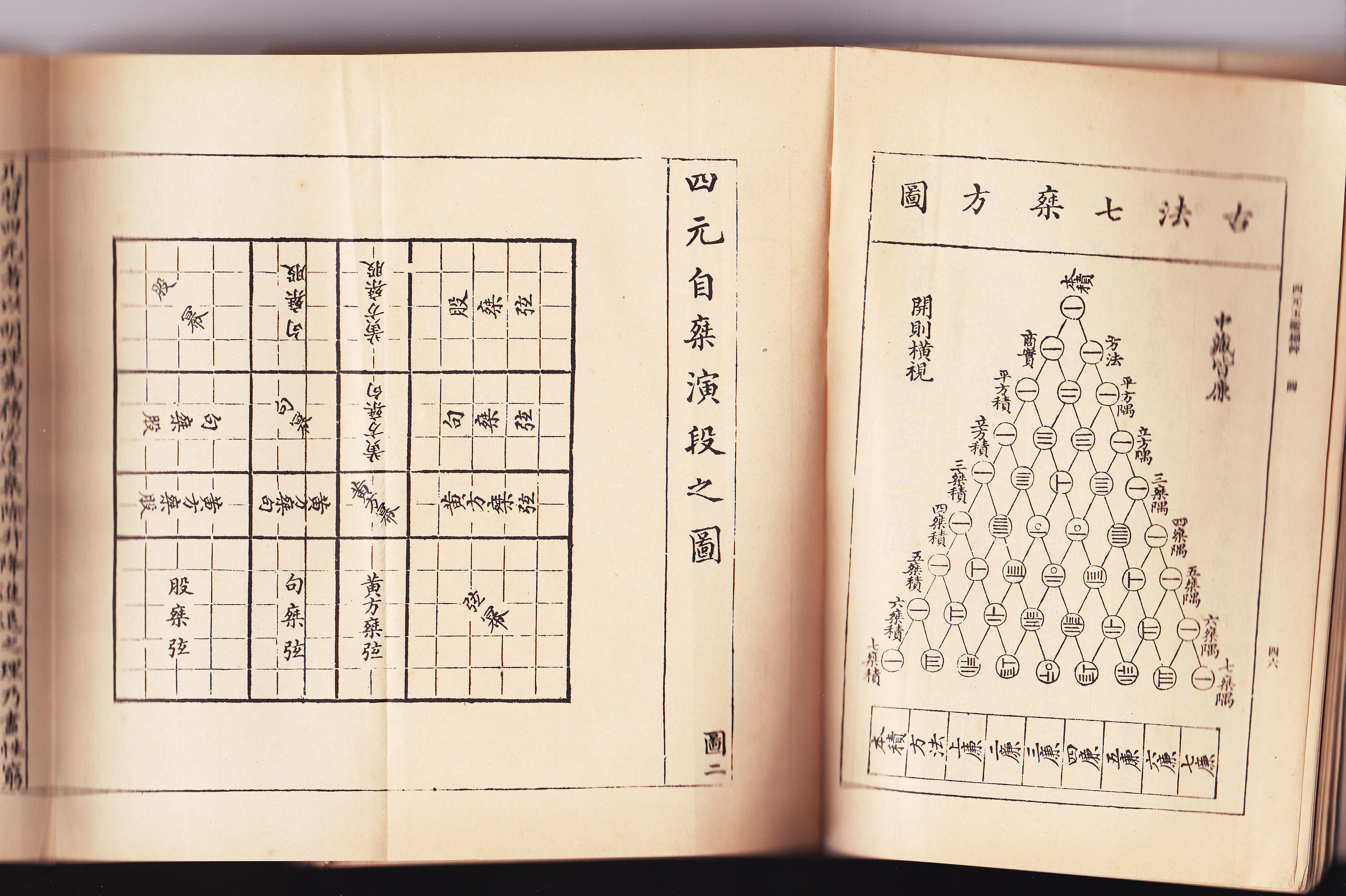
Illustrations in Jade Mirror of the Four Unknowns

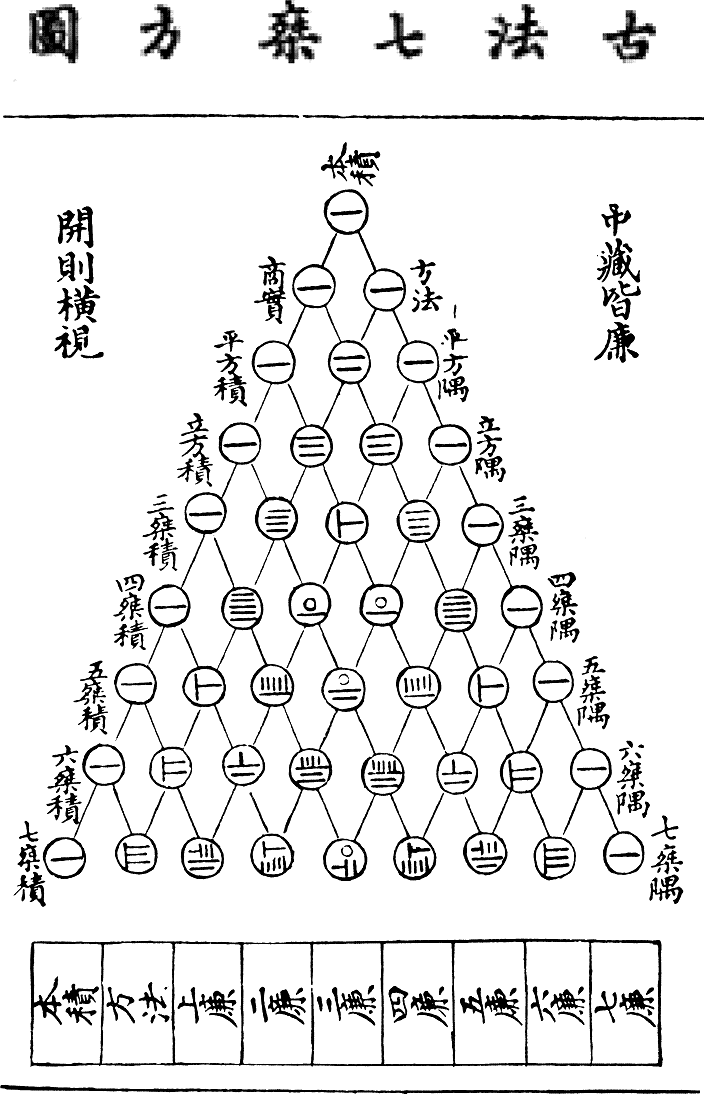
Jia Xian triangle

Jade Mirror of the Four Unknowns, Siyuan yujian (simplified Chinese: 四元玉鉴; traditional Chinese: 四元玉鑒), also referred to as Jade Mirror of the Four Origins, is a 1303 mathematical monograph by Yuan dynasty mathematician Zhu Shijie.

The book consists of an introduction and three books, with a total of 288 problems. The first four problems in the introduction illustrate his method of the four unknowns. He showed how to convert a problem stated verbally into a system of polynomial equations (up to the 14th order), by using up to four unknowns: 天 Heaven, 地 Earth, 人 Man, 物 Matter, and then how to reduce the system to a single polynomial equation in one unknown by successive elimination of unknowns. He then solved the high-order equation by Southern Song dynasty mathematician Qin Jiushao's "Ling long kai fang" method published in Shùshū Jiǔzhāng (“Mathematical Treatise in Nine Sections”) in 1247 (more than 570 years before English mathematician William Horner's method using synthetic division). To do this, he makes use of the Pascal triangle, which he labels as the diagram of an ancient method first discovered by Jia Xian before 1050.

Zhu also solved square and cube roots problems by solving quadratic and cubic equations, and added to the understanding of series and progressions, classifying them according to the coefficients of the Pascal triangle. He also showed how to solve systems of linear equations by reducing the matrix of their coefficients to diagonal form.

Jade Mirror of the Four Unknowns consists of four books, with 24 classes and 288 problems, in which 232 problems deal with Tian yuan shu, 36 problems deal with variable of two variables, 13 problems of three variables, and 7 problems of four variables.

== Introduction ==
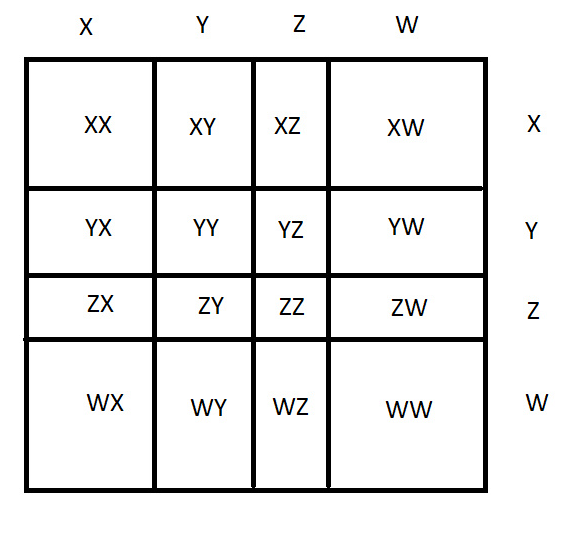
The Square of the Sum of the Four Quantities of a Right Angle Triangle

The four quantities are x, y, z, w can be presented with the following diagram

x

y 太w

z

The square of which is:

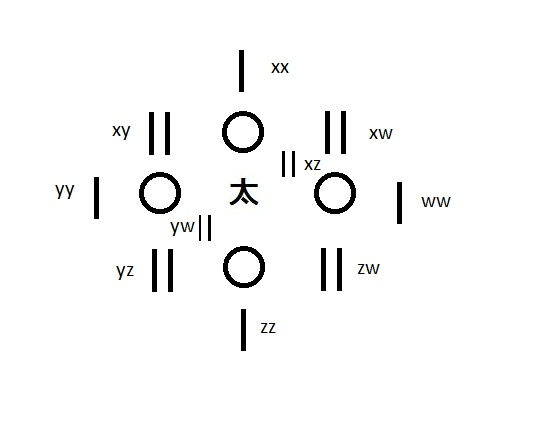

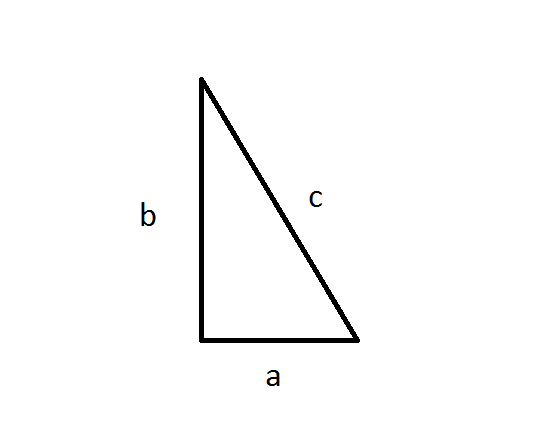
a:"go" base b "gu" vertical c "Xian" hypothenus

=== The Unitary Nebuls ===
This section deals with Tian yuan shu or problems of one unknown.

Question: Given the product of huangfan and zhi ji equals to 24 paces, and the sum of vertical and hypotenuse equals to 9 paces, what is the value of the base?
Answer: 3 paces
Set up unitary tian as the base (that is let the base be the unknown quantity x)

Since the product of huangfang and zhi ji = 24

in which

huangfan is defined as：$(a+b-c)$
zhi ji：$ab$

therefore $(a+b-c)ab=24$
Further, the sum of vertical and hypotenuse is

$$b+c=9$$

Set up the unknown unitary tian as the vertical

$x=a$

Then use Pythagoras to isolate c and b: $a^2+b^2=c^2\Longleftrightarrow c^2-b^2=a^2\Longleftrightarrow(c-b)(c+b)=a^2\Longleftrightarrow c-b=\frac{a^2}{c+b}=\frac{x^2}{9}$

such that we obtain:

$2c=(c+b)+(c-b)=9+\frac{x^2}{9}$

$2b=(c+b)-(c-b)=9-\frac{x^2}{9}$

Combining everything, we obtain the following equation:

（$x^5-9x^4-81x^3+729x^2=3888$）

太

details

We have $c=\frac{9^2+x^2}{18}$ and $b=\frac{9^2-x^2}{18}$,

so $(x+b-c)xb=x^2b+xb^2-xbc=x^2\left(\frac{9^2-x^2}{18}\right)+x\left(\frac{9^2-x^2}{18}\right)^2-x\left(\frac{9^2-x^2}{18}\right)\left(\frac{9^2+x^2}{18}\right)$.

Then we get $\frac{9^2x^2-x^4}{18}+x\left(\frac{9^4-18\times9x^2+x^4}{18^2}\right)-\frac{9^2x-x^3}{18}\left(\frac{9^2+x^2}{18}\right)$.

Which is $\frac{18\times9^2x^2-18x^4+9^4x-18\times9x^3+x^5-9^4x-9^2x^3+9^2x^3+x^5}{18^2}$.

If we now regroup by power: $2x^5-18x^4-18\times9x^3+18\times9^2x^2=24\times18^2$.

Cleaning up, we finally get: $x^5-9x^4-81x^3+729x^2=\frac{24\times18^2}{2}=3888$.

Solve it and obtain x=3

=== The Mystery of Two Natures ===
太 Unitary

equation: $-2y^2-xy^2+2xy+2x^2y+x^3=0$;

from the given

太

equation: $2y^2-xy^2+2xy+x^3=0$;

we get:

太

$$8x+4x^2=0$$

and

太

$$2x^2+x^3=0$$

by method of elimination, we obtain a quadratic equation

$$x^2-2x-8=0$$

solution: $x=4$.

=== The Evolution of Three Talents ===
Template for solution of problem of three unknowns

Zhu Shijie explained the method of elimination in detail. His example has been quoted frequently in scientific literature.

Set up three equations as follows

太

$-y-z-y^2 x-x+xyz=0$ .... I

$-y-z+x-x^2+xz=0$.....II

太

$y^2-z^2+x^2=0;$....III

Elimination of unknown between II and III

by manipulation of exchange of variables

We obtain

太

$-x-2x^2+y+y^2+xy-xy^2+x^2y$ ...IV

and

太

$-2x-2x^2+2y-2y^2+y^3+4xy-2xy^2+xy^2$.... V

Elimination of unknown between IV and V we obtain a 3rd order equation

$x^4-6x^3+4x^2+6x-5=0$

Solve to this 3rd order equation to obtain $x=5$;

Change back the variables

We obtain the hypothenus =5 paces

=== Simultaneous of the Four Elements ===
This section deals with simultaneous equations of four unknowns.

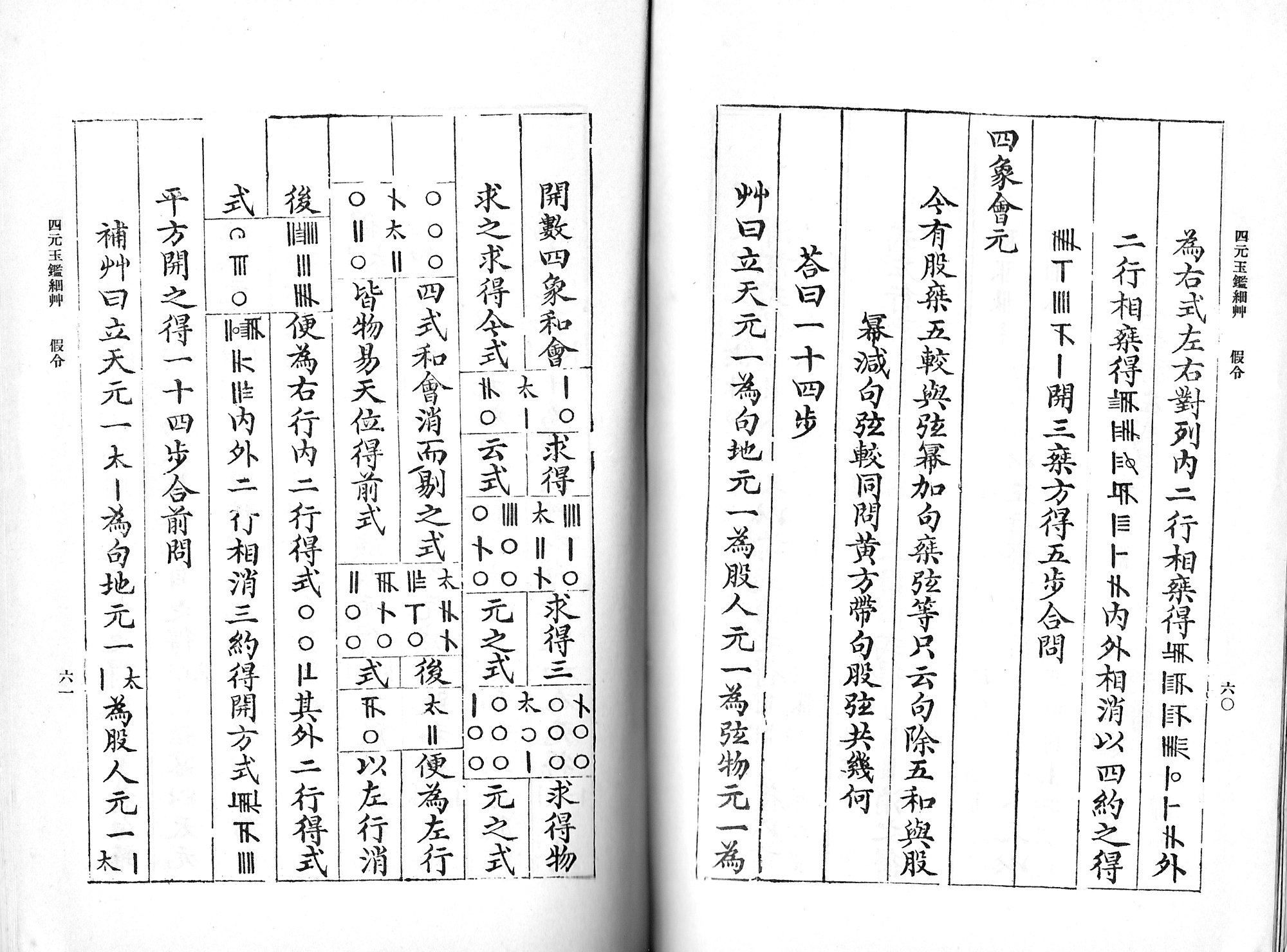
Equations of four Elements

$$\begin{cases}
-2y+x+z=0\\
-y^2x+4y+2x-x^2+4z+xz=0\\
x^2+y^2-z^2=0\\
2y-w+2x=0
\end{cases}$$

Successive elimination of unknowns to get

$4x^2-7x-686=0$

Solve this and obtain 14 paces

== Book I ==
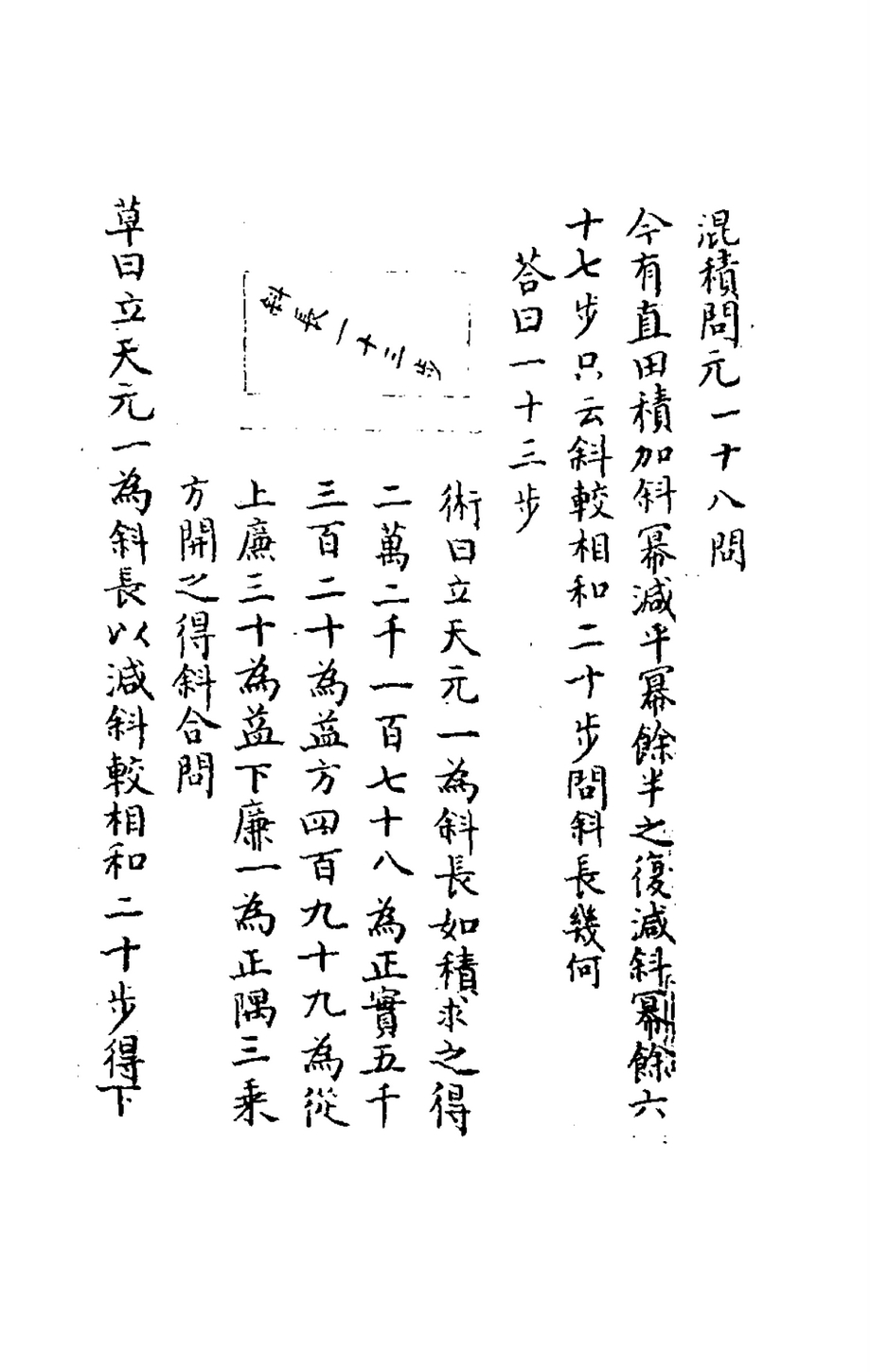

=== Problems of Right Angle Triangles and Rectangles ===
There are 18 problems in this section.

Problem 18

Obtain a tenth order polynomial equation:

$$16x^{10}-64x^9+160x^8-384x^7+512x^6-544x^5+456x^4+126x^3+3x^2-4x-177162=0$$

The root of which is x = 3, multiply by 4, getting 12. That is the final answer.

=== Problems of Plane Figures ===
There are 18 problems in this section

=== Problems of Piece Goods ===
There are 9 problems in this section

=== Problems on Grain Storage ===
There are 6 problems in this section

=== Problems on Labour ===
There are 7 problems in this section

=== Problems of Equations for Fractional Roots ===
There are 13 problems in this section

== Book II ==
=== Surveying with Right Angle Triangles ===
There are eight problems in this section

Problem 1

Question: There is a rectangular town of unknown dimension which has one gate on each side. There is a pagoda located at 240 paces from the south gate. A man walking 180 paces from the west gate can see the pagoda, he then walks towards the south-east corner for 240 paces and reaches the pagoda; what is the length and width of the rectangular town? Answer: 120 paces in length and width one li

Let tian yuan unitary as half of the length, we obtain a 4th order equation

$x^4+480x^3-270000x^2+15552000x+1866240000=0$

solve it and obtain x=240 paces, hence length =2x= 480 paces=1 li and 120 paces.

Similarity, let tian yuan unitary(x) equals to half of width

we get the equation:

$x^4+360x^3-270000x^2+20736000x+1866240000=0$

Solve it to obtain x=180 paces, length =360 paces =one li.

Problem 7
Identical to The depth of a ravine (using hence-forward cross-bars) in Haidao Suanjing.

Problem 8
Identical to The depth of a transparent pool in Haidao Suanjing.

=== Summon Men According to Need ===
Problem No 5 is the earliest 4th order interpolation formula in the world

men summoned :$na+\tfrac{1}{2!}n(n-1)b+\tfrac{1}{3!}n(n-1)(n-2)c+\tfrac{1}{4!}n(n-1)(n-2)(n-3)d$

In which

- a=1st order difference
- b=2nd order difference
- c=3rd order difference
- d=4th order difference

== Book III ==
=== Fruit pile ===
This section contains 20 problems dealing with triangular piles, rectangular piles

Problem 1

Find the sum of triangular pile

$$1+3+6+10+...+\frac 1 2 n(n+1)$$

and value of the fruit pile is:

$$v=2+9+24+50+90+147+224+\cdots +\frac 1 2 n(n+1)^2$$

Zhu Shijie use Tian yuan shu to solve this problem by letting x=n

and obtained the formular

$$v= \frac 1 {2 \cdot 3 \cdot 4} (3x+5)x(x+1)(x+2)$$

From given condition $v=1320$, hence

$3x^4+14x^3+21x^2+10x-31680=0$

Solve it to obtain $x=n=9$.

Therefore,

$v=2+9+24+50+90+147+224+324+450=1320$。

=== Equation of Four Unknowns ===
Six problems of four unknowns.

Question 2

Yield a set of equations in four unknowns: .

$$\begin{cases}
-3y^2+8y-8x+8z=0\\
4y^2-8xy+3x^2-8yz+6xz+3z^2=0\\
y^2+x^2-z^2=0\\
2y+4x+2z-w=0
\end{cases}$$
