= Yigu yanduan =

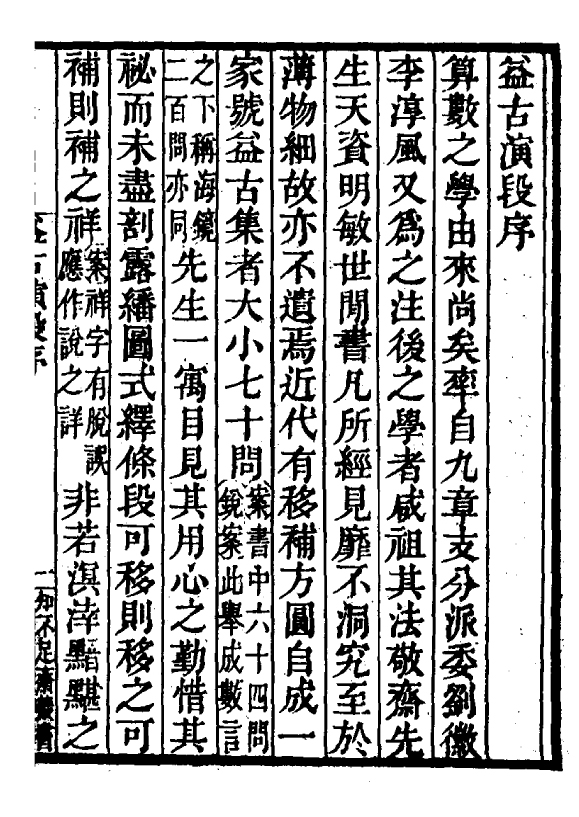
Preface to Yigu yanduan, Siku Quanshu

Yigu yanduan (益古演段 Old Mathematics in Expanded Sections) is a 13th-century mathematical work by Yuan dynasty mathematician Li Zhi.

== Overview ==
Yigu yanduan was based on Northern Song mathematician Jiang Zhou's (蒋周) Yigu Ji (益古集 Collection of Old Mathematics) which is not extant. However, from fragments quoted in Yang Hui's work The Complete Algorithms of Acreage (田亩比类算法大全), this lost mathematical treatise Yigu Ji was about solving area problems with geometry.

Li Zhi used the examples of Yigu Ji to introduce the art of Tian yuan shu to newcomers to this field. Although Li Zhi's previous monograph Ceyuan haijing also used Tian yuan shu, it is harder to understand than Yigu yanduan.

Yigu yanduan was later collected into Siku Quanshu.

Yigu yanduan consists of three volumes with 64 problems solved using Tian yuan shu in parallel with the geometrical method. Li Zhi intended to introduce students to the art of Tian yuan shu through ancient geometry. Yigu yanduan together with Ceyuan haijing are considered major contributions to Tian yuan shu by Li Zhi. These two works are also considered as the earliest extant documents on Tian yuans shu.

All the 64 problems followed more or less the same format, starting with a question (问), followed by an answer (答曰), a diagram, then an algorithm (术), in which Li Zhi explained step by step how to set up algebra equation with Tian yuan shu, then followed by geometrical interpretation (Tiao duan shu). The order of arrangement of Tian yuan shu equation in Yigu yanduan is the reverse of that in Ceyuan haijing, i.e., here with the constant term at top, followed by first order tian yuan, second order tian yuan, third order tian yuan etc. This later arrangement conformed with contemporary convention of algebra equation( for instance, Qin Jiushao's Mathematical Treatise in Nine Sections), and later became a norm.

Yigu yanduan was first introduced to the English readers by the British Protestant Christian missionary to China, Alexander Wylie who wrote:

Yi koo yen t'wan...written in 1282 consists of 64 geometrical problem, illustrated the principle of Plane Measurement, Evolution and other rules, the whole being developed by means of T'een yuen.

In 1913 Van Hée translated all 64 problems in Yigu yanduan into French.

== Volume I ==
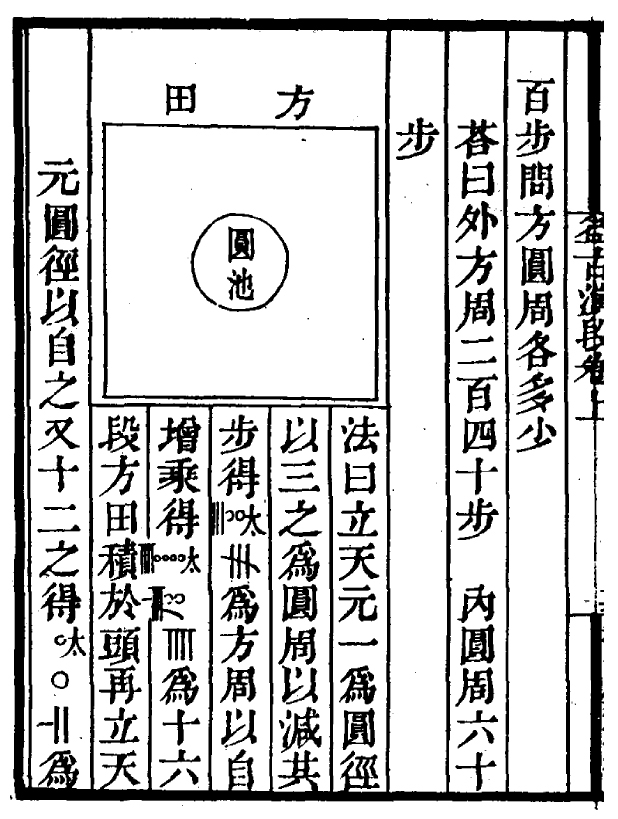
Problem 8 in Yigu yanduan solved by in line Tian yuan shu

Problem 1 to 22, all about the mathematics of a circle embedded in a square.

Example: problem 8

There is a square field, with a circular pool in the middle, given that the land is 13.75 mu, and the sum of the circumferences of the square field and the circular pool equals to 300 steps, what is the circumferences of the square and circle respective ?

Answer: The circumference of the square is 240 steps, the circumference of the circle is 60 steps.

Method: set up tian yuan one (celestial element 1) as the diameter of the circle, x

TAI

multiply it by 3 to get the circumference of the circle 3x ($\pi\approx3$)

TAI

subtract this from the sum of circumferences to obtain the circumference of the square $300-3x$

TAI

The square of it equals to 16 times the area of the square $(300-3x)*(300-3x) = 90000 -1800x +9x^2$

TAI

Again set up tian yuan 1 as the diameter of circle, square it up and multiplied by 12 to get 16 times the area of circle as

TAI

subtract from 16 time square area we have 16 times area of land

TAI

put it at right hand side and put 16 times 13.75 mu = 16 * 13.75 *240 =52800 steps at left, after cancellation, we get $-3x^2-1800x+37200=0:$

TAI

Solve this equation to get diameter of circle = 20 steps, circumference of circle = 60 steps

== Volume II ==
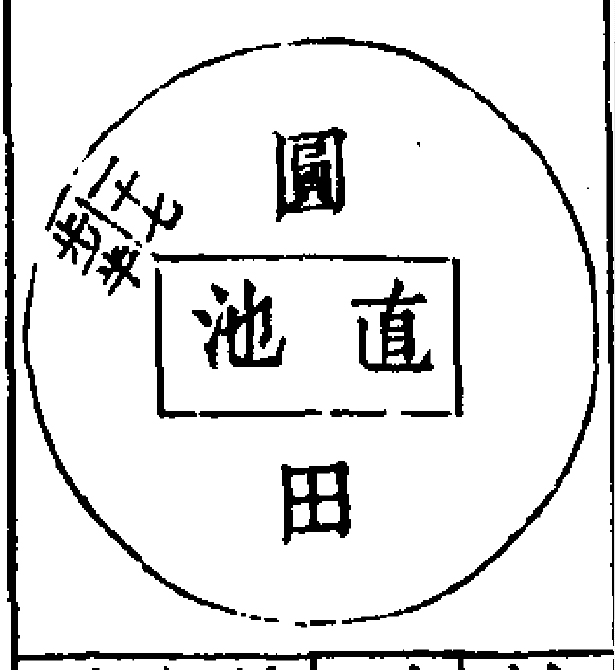

Problem 23 to 42, 20 problems in all solving geometry of rectangle embedded in circle with tian yuan shu

Example, problem 35

Suppose we have a circular field with a rectangular water pool in the center, and the distance of a corner to the circumference is 17.5 steps, and the sum of length and width of the pool is 85 steps, what is the diameter of the circle, the length and width of the pool ?

Answer: The diameter of the circle is one hundred steps, the length of pool is 60 steps, and the width 25 steps. Method: Let tian yuan one as the diagonal of rectangle, then the diameter of circle is tian yuan one plus 17.5*2

$$x+35$$

multiply the square of diameter with $\pi \approx 3$ equals to four times the area of the circle:

$$3 (x + 35)^2 =3x^2+ 210x + 3675$$

subtracting four times the area of land to obtain:

four times the area of pool = $3 x^2 + 210x + 3675- 4 x 6000$= $3 x^2+210x -20325$

now

The square of the sum of length and width of the pool =85*85 =7225 which is four times the pool area plus the square of the difference of its length and width ($(L-W)^2$)

Further double the pool area plus $(L-W)^2$ equals to $L^2 +W^2$ = the square of the diagonal of the pool thus

( four time pool area + the square of its dimension difference) - (twice the pool area + square if its dimension difference) equals $7225 -x^2$ = twice the pool area

so four times the area of pool = $2 (7225 - x^2)$

equate this with the four times pool area obtained above

$2 (7225 - x^2)$ =$3 x^2+210x -20325$

we get a quadratic equation $5 x^2 + 210x - 34775$=0 Solve this equation to get

- diagonal of pool =65 steps
- diameter of circle =65 +2*17.5 =100 steps
- Length - width =35 steps
- Length + width =85 steps
- Length =60 steps
- Width =25 steps

== Volume III ==
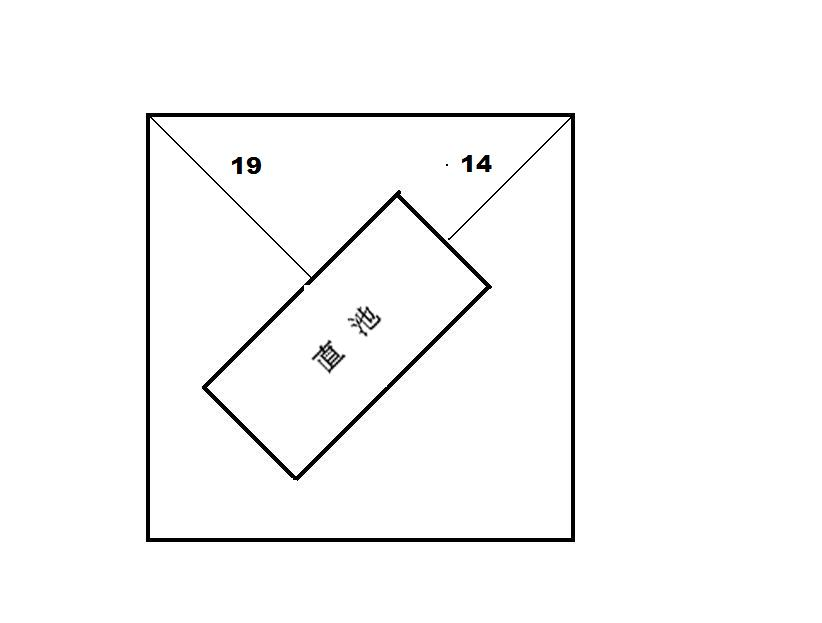

Problem 42 to 64, altogether 22 questions about the mathematics of more complex diagrams

Q: fifty-fourth. There is a square field, with a rectangular water pool lying on its diagonal. The area outside the pool is one thousand one hundred fifty paces. Given that from the corners of the field to the straight sides of the pool are fourteen paces and nineteen paces. What is the area of the square field, what is the length and width of the pool?

Answer: The area of the square field is 40 square paces, the length of the pool is thirty five paces, and the width is twenty five paces.

Let the width of the pool be Tianyuan 1.

TAI

Add the width of the pool to twice the distance from field corner to short long side of pool equals to the length of diagonal of the field x+38

TAI

Square it to obtain the area of square with the length of the pool diagonal as its sides

$$x^2 +76x +1444$$

TAI

The length of pool minus the width of pool multiplied by 2 = 2 (19-14) = 10

Pool length = pool width +10: x+10

TAI

Pool area = pool with times pool length : x(x+10) =$x^2 +10x$

TAI

Area of pool times 乘 1.96 ( the square root of 2) =1.4

one has $1.96x^2 +19.6x$

tai

Area of diagonal square subtract area of pool multiplied 1.96 equals to area of land times 1.96:

$x^2 +76x +1444$ - $1.96x^2 +19.6x =$：$-0.96x^2 +56.4 x +1444$

TAI

Occupied plot times 1.96 =1150 * 1.96 =2254=$-0.96x^2 +56.4 x +1444$

hence =$-0.96x^2 +56.4 x -810$:

TAI

Solve this equation and we obtain

width of pool 25 paces therefore pool length =pool width +10 =35 paces length of pool =45 paces
