= Zhu Shijie =

Chinese mathematician during the Yuan dynasty

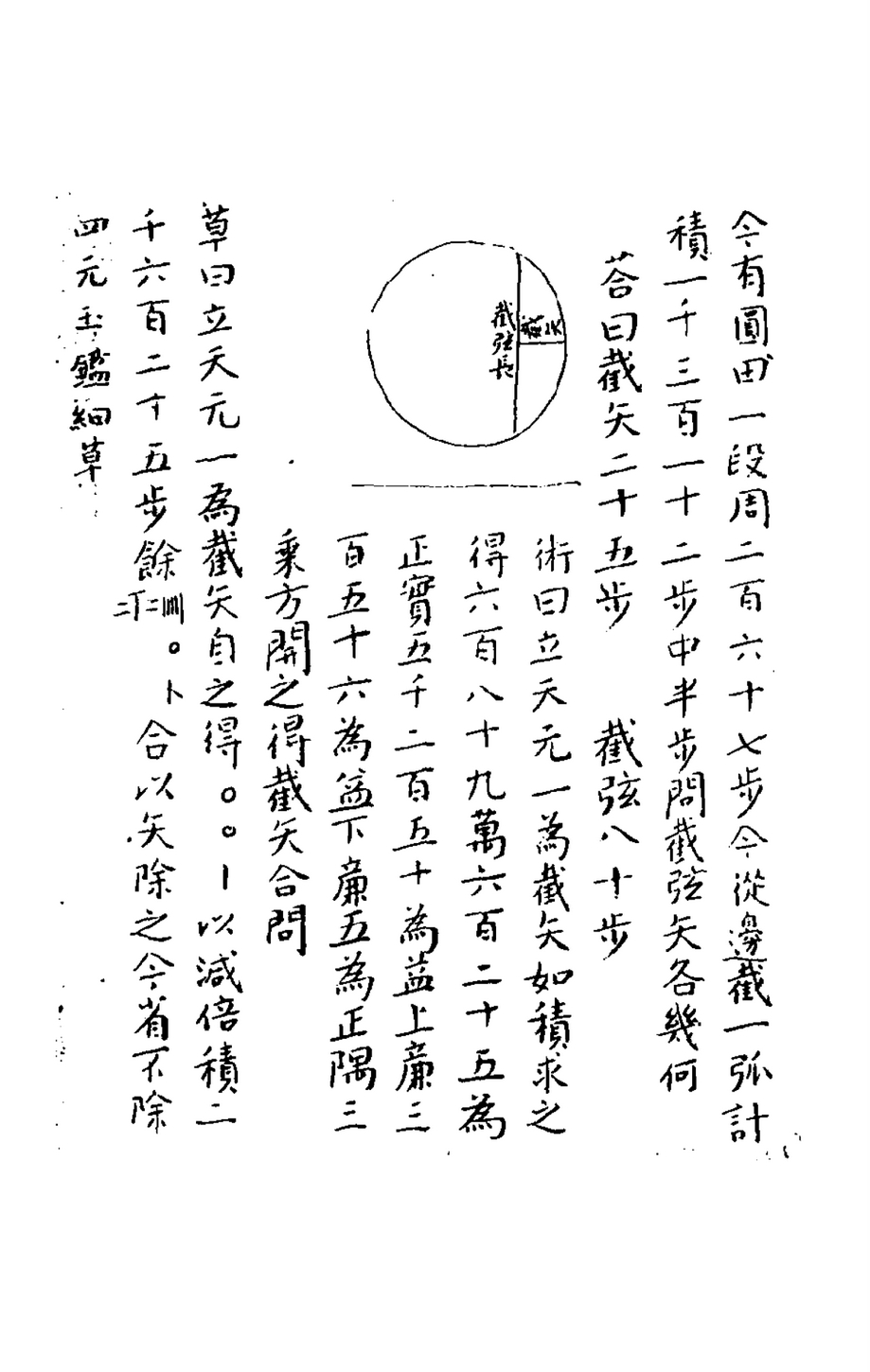
A page of Zhu Shijie's famous Jade Mirror of the Four Unknowns

Zhu Shijie (simplified Chinese: 朱世杰; traditional Chinese: 朱世傑; pinyin: Zhū Shìjié; Wade–Giles: Chu Shih-chieh, 1249–1314), courtesy name Hanqing (漢卿), pseudonym Songting (松庭), was a Chinese mathematician and writer during the Yuan Dynasty. Zhu was born close to today's Beijing. Two of his mathematical works have survived: Introduction to Computational Studies (算學啓蒙 Suan-hsüeh Ch'i-mong) and Jade Mirror of the Four Unknowns (四元玉鑒 Ssŭ-yüan Yü-chien).

== Suanxue Qimeng ==
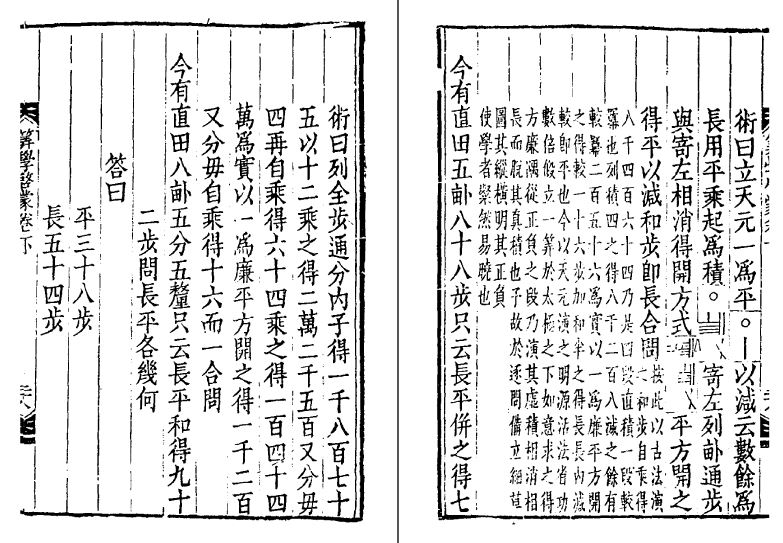
Suanxue Qimeng

The Suanxue Qimeng (算學啓蒙), written in 1299, is an elementary textbook on mathematics in three volumes, 20 chapters and 259 problems. This book also showed how to measure two-dimensional shapes and three-dimensional solids. The Introduction strongly influenced the development of mathematics in Japan. The book was once lost in China until the Qing dynasty mathematician Luo Shilin bought a Korean printed edition and republished it in Yangzhou.

== Jade Mirror of the Four Unknowns ==
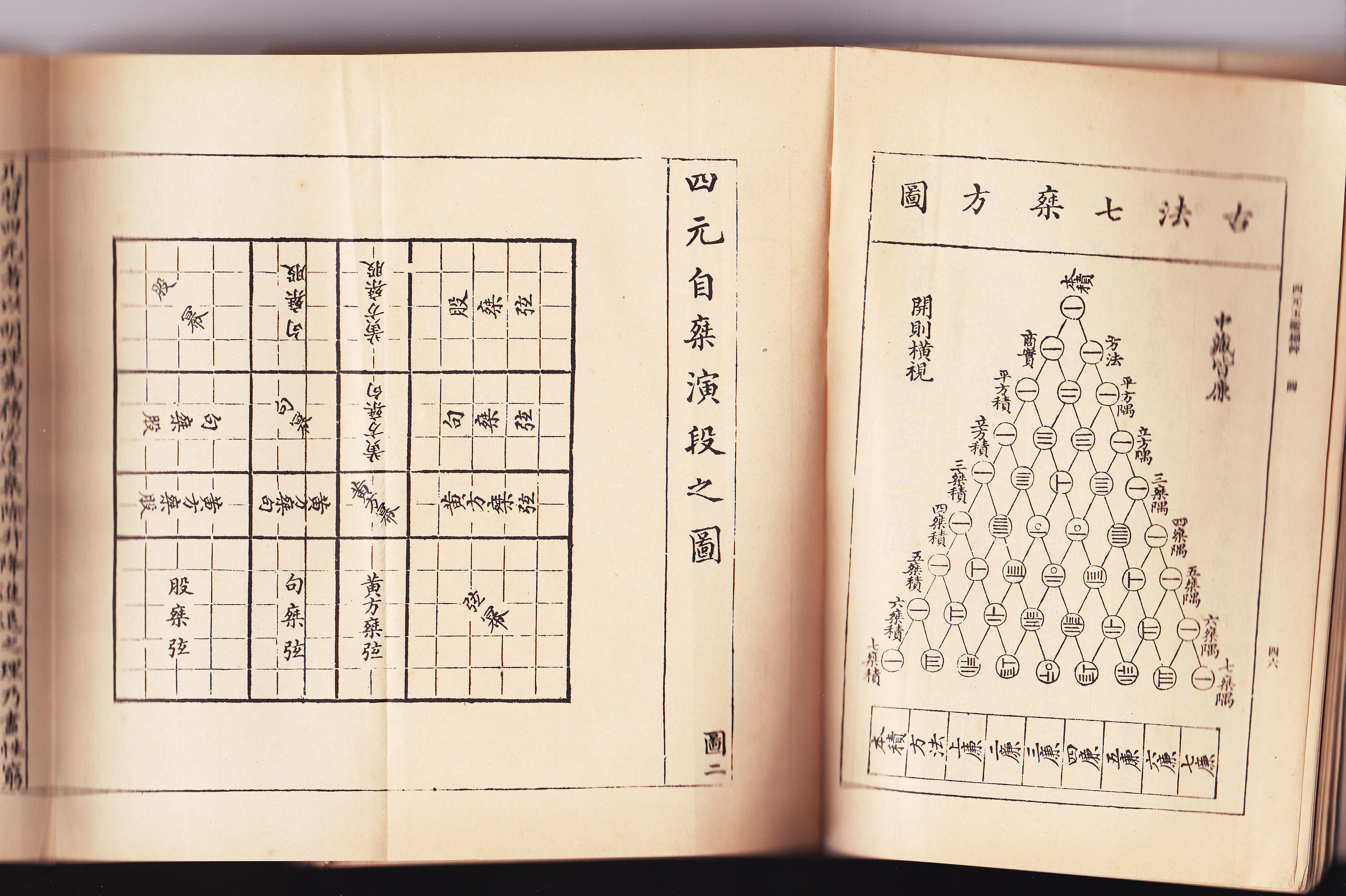
Illustrations in Jade Mirror of the Four Unknowns

Zhu's second book, Jade Mirror of the Four Unknowns (1303) was his most important work, advancing Chinese algebra. The first four of the 288 solved problems illustrate his method of the four unknowns. He shows how to convert a problem stated verbally into a system of polynomial equations (up to 14th order), by using up to four unknowns: 天 Heaven, 地 Earth, 人 Man, 物 Matter, and then how to reduce the system to a single polynomial equation in one unknown by successive elimination of unknowns. He then solves the high order equation by the ling long kai fang (玲瓏開方) method of Southern Song dynasty mathematician Qin Jiushao (from Shùshū Jiǔzhāng, “Mathematical Treatise in Nine Sections” of 1247). This was more than 570 years before English mathematician William Horner's method using synthetic division. Zhu makes use of what is currently known as Pascal's triangle, which he refers to as discovered by Jia Xian before 1050. The final equation and one of its solutions are given for each of the 288 problems.

Zhu also found square and cube roots by solving quadratic and cubic equations, and added to the understanding of series and progressions, classifying them according to the coefficients of the Pascal triangle. He also showed how to solve systems of linear equations by reducing the matrix of their coefficients to diagonal form. He moreover applied these methods to algebraic equations, using a version of the resultant. His methods pre-date Blaise Pascal, William Horner, and modern matrix methods by many centuries. The preface of the book describes how Zhu traveled China for 20 years teaching mathematics.

The methods of Jade Mirror of the Four Unknowns form the foundation for Wu's method of characteristic set.
