= Chinese mathematics =

Mathematics used in Ancient China

Mathematics emerged independently in China by the 11th century BCE. The Chinese independently developed a real number system that includes significantly large and negative numbers, more than one numeral system (binary and decimal), algebra, geometry, number theory and trigonometry.

Since the Han dynasty, as diophantine approximation being a prominent numerical method, the Chinese made substantial progress on polynomial evaluation. Algorithms like regula falsi and expressions like simple continued fractions are widely used and have been well-documented ever since. They deliberately find the principal nth root of positive numbers and the roots of equations. The major texts from the period, The Nine Chapters on the Mathematical Art and the Book on Numbers and Computation gave detailed processes for solving various mathematical problems in daily life. All procedures were computed using a counting board in both texts, and they included inverse elements as well as Euclidean divisions. The texts provide procedures similar to that of Gaussian elimination and Horner's method for linear algebra. The achievement of Chinese algebra reached a zenith in the 13th century during the Yuan dynasty with the development of tian yuan shu.

As a result of obvious linguistic and geographic barriers, as well as content, Chinese mathematics and the mathematics of the ancient Mediterranean world are presumed to have developed more or less independently up to the time when The Nine Chapters on the Mathematical Art reached its final form, while the Book on Numbers and Computation and Huainanzi are roughly contemporary with classical Greek mathematics. Some exchange of ideas across Asia through known cultural exchanges from at least Roman times is likely. Frequently, elements of the mathematics of early societies correspond to rudimentary results found later in branches of modern mathematics such as geometry or number theory. The Pythagorean theorem for example, has been attested to the time of the Duke of Zhou. Knowledge of Pascal's triangle has also been shown to have existed in China centuries before Pascal, such as the Song-era polymath Shen Kuo.

== Pre-imperial era ==
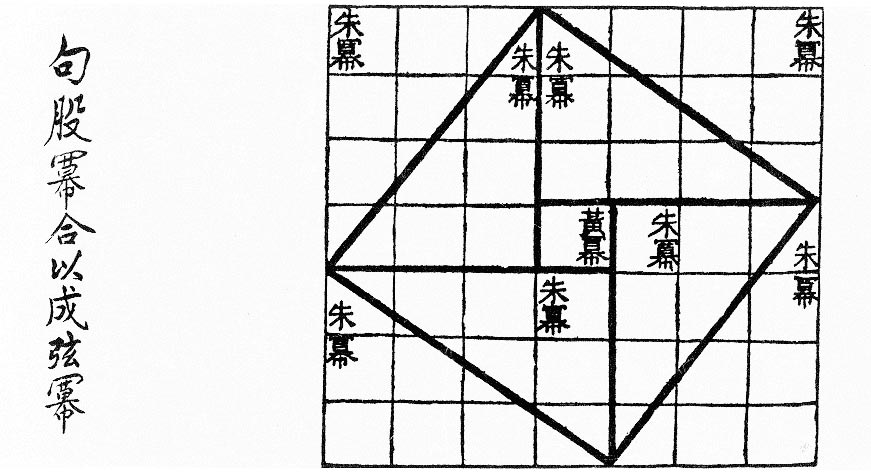
Visual proof for the (3, 4, 5) triangle as in the Zhoubi Suanjing 500–200 BCE

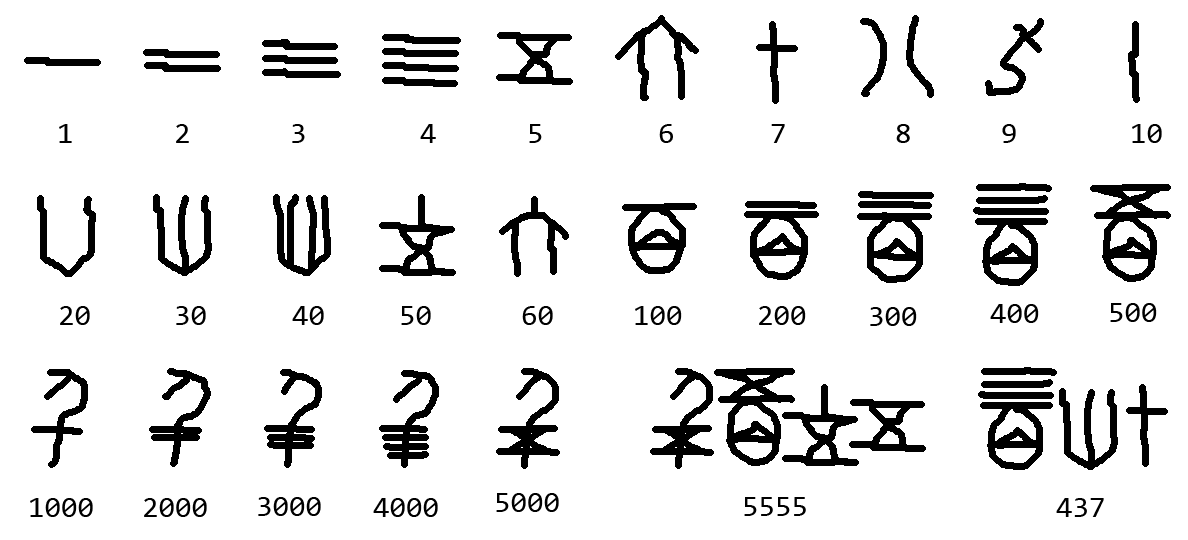
The Oracle Bone Script numeral system

The counting rod decimal system

One of the oldest surviving mathematical works is the I Ching, which greatly influenced written literature during the Zhou dynasty (1050–256 BC). For mathematics, the book included a sophisticated use of hexagrams. As Leibniz pointed out, the I Ching (Yi Jing) also contained elements of binary numbers.

Since the Shang period, the Chinese had already fully developed a decimal system. Since early times, Chinese understood basic arithmetic (which dominated far eastern history), algebra, equations, and negative numbers with counting rods. Although the Chinese were more focused on arithmetic and advanced algebra for astronomical uses, they were also the first to develop negative numbers, algebraic geometry, and the usage of decimals.

Math was one of the Six Arts students were required to master during the Zhou dynasty (1122–256 BCE). Learning them all perfectly was required to be a perfect gentleman, comparable to the concept of a "renaissance man". Six Arts have their roots in the Confucian philosophy.

The oldest existent work on geometry in China comes from the philosophical Mohist canon c. 330 BCE, compiled by the followers of Mozi (470–390 BCE). The Mo Jing described various aspects of many fields associated with physical science, and provided a small wealth of information on mathematics as well. It provided an 'atomic' definition of the geometric point, stating that a line is separated into parts, and the part which has no remaining parts (i.e. cannot be divided into smaller parts) and thus forms the extreme end of a line is a point. Much like Euclid's first and third definitions and Plato's 'beginning of a line', the Mo Jing stated that "a point may stand at the end (of a line) or at its beginning like a head-presentation in childbirth. (As to its invisibility) there is nothing similar to it." Similar to the atomists of Democritus, the Mo Jing stated that a point is the smallest unit, and cannot be cut in half, "since 'nothing' cannot be halved." It stated that "(two things having the) same length, means that two straight lines finish at the same place", while providing definitions for the comparison of lengths and for parallels, along with principles of space and bounded space. It also described the fact that planes without the quality of thickness cannot be piled up since they cannot mutually touch. The book provided word recognition for circumference, diameter, and radius, along with the definition of volume.

The history of mathematical development lacks some evidence. There are still debates about certain mathematical classics. For example, the Zhoubi Suanjing dates around 1200–1000 BC, yet many scholars believed it was written between 300 and 250 BCE. The Zhoubi Suanjing contains an in-depth proof of the Gougu Theorem (a special case of the Pythagorean theorem), but focuses more on astronomical calculations. However, the recent archaeological discovery of the Tsinghua Bamboo Slips, dated c. 305 BCE, has revealed some aspects of pre-Qin mathematics, such as the first known decimal multiplication table.

The abacus was first mentioned in the second century BC, alongside 'calculation with rods' (suan zi) in which small bamboo sticks are placed in successive squares of a checkerboard.

== Qin dynasty ==
Not much is known about Qin dynasty mathematics, or before, due to the burning of books and burying of scholars, circa 213–210 BC. Knowledge of this period can be determined from civil projects and historical evidence. The Qin dynasty created a standard system of weights. Civil projects of the Qin dynasty were significant feats of human engineering. Emperor Qin Shi Huang ordered many men to build large, life-sized statues for the palace tomb along with other temples and shrines, and the shape of the tomb was designed with geometric skills of architecture. It is certain that one of the greatest feats of human history, the Great Wall of China, required many mathematical techniques. All Qin dynasty buildings and grand projects used advanced computation formulas for volume, area and proportion.

Qin bamboo cash purchased at the antiquarian market of Hong Kong by the Yuelu Academy, according to the preliminary reports, contains the earliest epigraphic sample of a mathematical treatise.

== Han dynasty ==
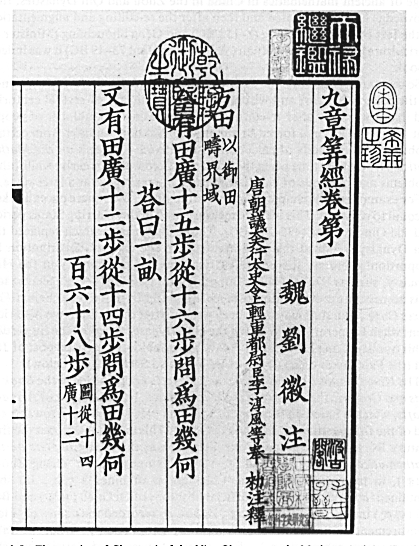
The Nine Chapters on the Mathematical Art

In the Han dynasty, numbers were developed into a place value decimal system and used on a counting board with a set of counting rods called rod calculus, consisting of only nine symbols with a blank space on the counting board representing zero. Negative numbers and fractions were also incorporated into solutions of the great mathematical texts of the period. The mathematical texts of the time, the Book on Numbers and Computation and Jiuzhang suanshu solved basic arithmetic problems such as addition, subtraction, multiplication and division. Furthermore, they gave the processes for square and cubed root extraction, which eventually was applied to solving quadratic equations up to the third order. Both texts also made substantial progress in Linear Algebra, namely solving systems of equations with multiple unknowns. The value of pi is taken to be equal to three in both texts. However, the mathematicians Liu Xin (d. 23) and Zhang Heng (78–139) gave more accurate approximations for pi than Chinese of previous centuries had used. Mathematics was developed to solve practical problems in the time such as division of land or problems related to division of payment. The Chinese did not focus on theoretical proofs based on geometry or algebra in the modern sense of proving equations to find area or volume. The Book of Computations and The Nine Chapters on the Mathematical Art provide numerous practical examples that would be used in daily life.

=== Book on Numbers and Computation ===
The Book on Numbers and Computation is approximately seven thousand characters in length, written on 190 bamboo strips. It was discovered together with other writings in 1984 when archaeologists opened a tomb at Zhangjiashan in Hubei province. From documentary evidence this tomb is known to have been closed in 186 BC, early in the Western Han dynasty. While its relationship to the Nine Chapters is still under discussion by scholars, some of its contents are clearly paralleled there. The text of the Suan shu shu is however much less systematic than the Nine Chapters, and appears to consist of a number of more or less independent short sections of text drawn from a number of sources.

The Book of Computations contains many prerequisites to problems that would be expanded upon in The Nine Chapters on the Mathematical Art. An example of the elementary mathematics in the Suàn shù shū, the square root is approximated by using false position method which says to "combine the excess and deficiency as the divisor; (taking) the deficiency numerator multiplied by the excess denominator and the excess numerator times the deficiency denominator, combine them as the dividend." Furthermore, The Book of Computations solves systems of two equations and two unknowns using the same false position method.

=== The Nine Chapters on the Mathematical Art ===
The Nine Chapters on the Mathematical Art dates archeologically to 179 CE, though it is traditionally dated to 1000 BCE, but it was written perhaps as early as 300–200 BCE. Although the author(s) are unknown, they made a major contribution in the eastern world. Problems are set up with questions immediately followed by answers and procedure. There are no formal mathematical proofs within the text, just a step-by-step procedure. The commentary of Liu Hui provided geometrical and algebraic proofs to the problems given within the text.

The Nine Chapters on the Mathematical Art was one of the most influential of all Chinese mathematical books and it is composed of 246 problems. It was later incorporated into The Ten Computational Canons, which became the core of mathematical education in later centuries. This book includes 246 problems on surveying, agriculture, partnerships, engineering, taxation, calculation, the solution of equations, and the properties of right triangles. The Nine Chapters made significant additions to solving quadratic equations in a way similar to Horner's method. It also made advanced contributions to fangcheng, or what is now known as linear algebra. Chapter seven solves system of linear equations with two unknowns using the false position method, similar to The Book of Computations. Chapter eight deals with solving determinate and indeterminate simultaneous linear equations using positive and negative numbers, with one problem dealing with solving four equations in five unknowns. The Nine Chapters solves systems of equations using methods similar to the modern Gaussian elimination and back substitution.

The version of The Nine Chapters that has served as the foundation for modern renditions was a result of the efforts of the scholar Dai Zhen. Transcribing the problems directly from Yongle Encyclopedia, he then proceeded to make revisions to the original text, along with the inclusion his own notes explaining his reasoning behind the alterations. His finished work would be first published in 1774, but a new revision would be published in 1776 to correct various errors as well as include a version of The Nine Chapters from the Southern Song that contained the commentaries of Lui Hui and Li Chunfeng. The final version of Dai Zhen's work would come in 1777, titled Ripple Pavilion, with this final rendition being widely distributed and coming to serve as the standard for modern versions of The Nine Chapters. However, this version has come under scrutiny from Guo Shuchen, alleging that the edited version still contains numerous errors and that not all of the original amendments were done by Dai Zhen himself.

=== Calculation of pi ===
Problems in The Nine Chapters on the Mathematical Art take pi to be equal to three in calculating problems related to circles and spheres, such as spherical surface area. There is no explicit formula given within the text for the calculation of pi to be three, but it is used throughout the problems of both The Nine Chapters on the Mathematical Art and the Artificer's Record, which was produced in the same time period. Historians believe that this figure of pi was calculated using the 3:1 relationship between the circumference and diameter of a circle. Some Han mathematicians attempted to improve this number, such as Liu Xin, who is believed to have estimated pi to be 3.154. Later, Liu Hui attempted to improve the calculation by calculating pi to be 3.141024. Liu calculated this number by using polygons inside a hexagon as a lower limit compared to a circle. Zu Chongzhi later discovered the calculation of pi to be 3.1415926 < π < 3.1415927 by using polygons with 24,576 sides. This calculation would be discovered in Europe during the 16th century.

There is no explicit method or record of how he calculated this estimate.

=== Division and root extraction ===
Basic arithmetic processes such as addition, subtraction, multiplication and division were present before the Han dynasty. The Nine Chapters on the Mathematical Art take these basic operations for granted and simply instruct the reader to perform them. Han mathematicians calculated square and cube roots in a similar manner as division, and problems on division and root extraction both occur in Chapter Four of The Nine Chapters on the Mathematical Art. Calculating the square and cube roots of numbers is done through successive approximation, the same as division, and often uses similar terms such as dividend (shi) and divisor (fa) throughout the process. This process of successive approximation was then extended to solving quadratics of the second and third order, such as $x^2+a=b$, using a method similar to Horner's method. The method was not extended to solve quadratics of the nth order during the Han dynasty; however, this method was eventually used to solve these equations.

Fangcheng on a counting board

=== Linear algebra ===
The Book of Computations is the first known text to solve systems of equations with two unknowns. There are a total of three sets of problems within The Book of Computations involving solving systems of equations with the false position method, which again are put into practical terms. Chapter Seven of The Nine Chapters on the Mathematical Art also deals with solving a system of two equations with two unknowns with the false position method. To solve for the greater of the two unknowns, the false position method instructs the reader to cross-multiply the minor terms or zi (which are the values given for the excess and deficit) with the major terms mu. To solve for the lesser of the two unknowns, simply add the minor terms together.

Chapter Eight of The Nine Chapters on the Mathematical Art deals with solving infinite equations with infinite unknowns. This process is referred to as the "fangcheng procedure" throughout the chapter. Many historians chose to leave the term fangcheng untranslated due to conflicting evidence of what the term means. Many historians translate the word to linear algebra today. In this chapter, the process of Gaussian elimination and back-substitution are used to solve systems of equations with many unknowns. Problems were done on a counting board and included the use of negative numbers as well as fractions. The counting board was effectively a matrix, where the top line is the first variable of one equation and the bottom was the last.

=== Liu Hui's commentary on The Nine Chapters on the Mathematical Art ===
Liu Hui's exhaustion method

Liu Hui's commentary on The Nine Chapters on the Mathematical Art is the earliest edition of the original text available. Hui is believed by most to be a mathematician shortly after the Han dynasty. Within his commentary, Hui qualified and proved some of the problems from either an algebraic or geometrical standpoint. For instance, throughout The Nine Chapters on the Mathematical Art, the value of pi is taken to be equal to three in problems regarding circles or spheres. In his commentary, Liu Hui finds a more accurate estimation of pi using the method of exhaustion. The method constructs polygons of successively higher-order within a circle, and seeing that the areas of the polygons approach the area of the circle as a limit. From this method, Liu Hui asserted that the value of pi is about 3.14. Liu Hui also presented a geometric proof of square and cubed root extraction similar to the Greek method, which involved cutting a square or cube in any line or section and determining the square root through symmetry of the remaining rectangles.

== Three Kingdoms, Jin, and Sixteen Kingdoms ==
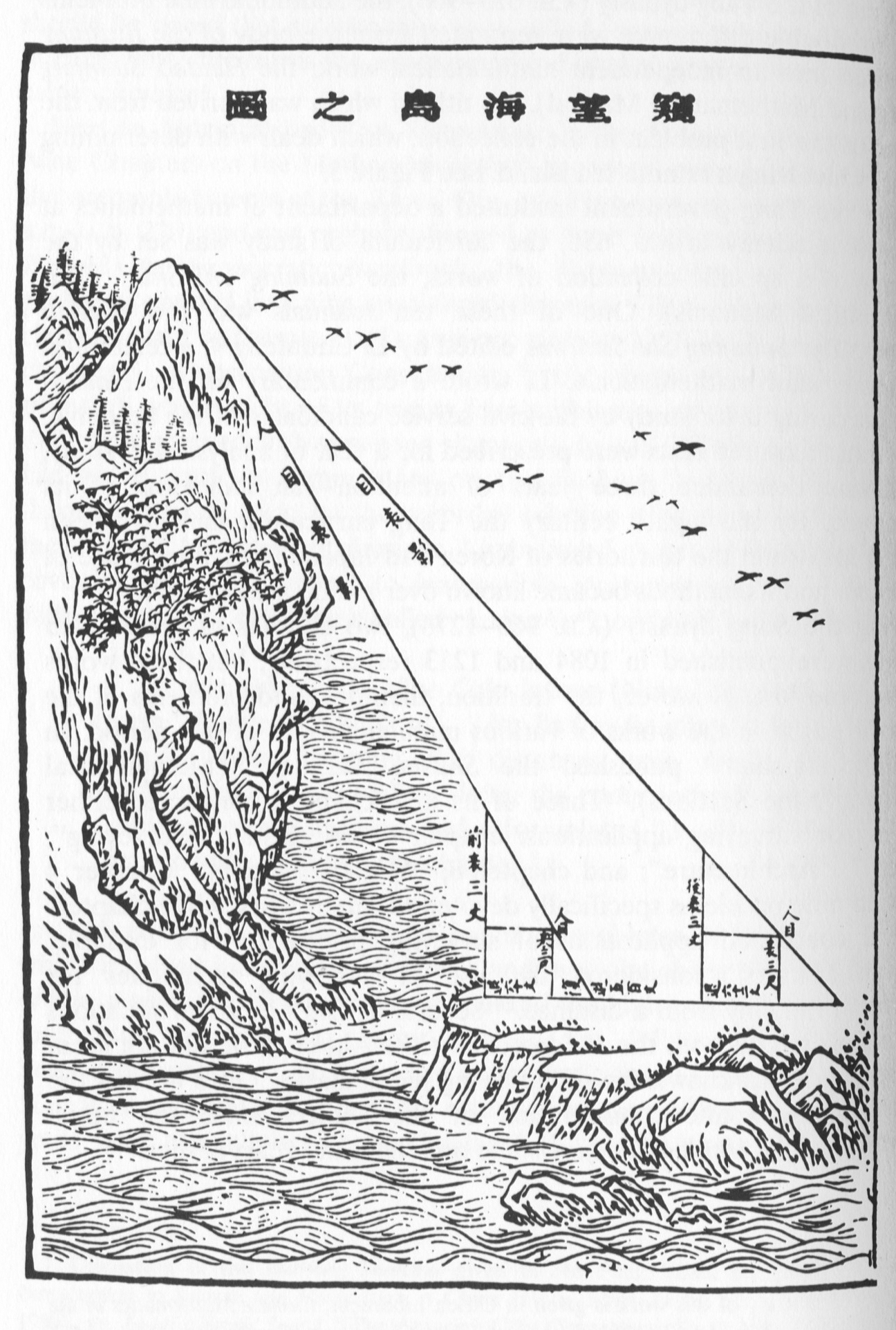
Liu Hui's Survey of sea island

Sunzi algorithm for division 400 AD

al Khwarizmi division in the 9th century

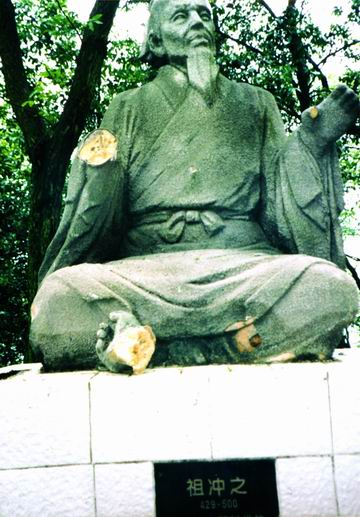
Statue of Zu Chongzhi.

In the third century Liu Hui wrote his commentary on the Nine Chapters and also wrote Haidao Suanjing which dealt with using Pythagorean theorem (already known by the 9 chapters), and triple, quadruple triangulation for surveying; his accomplishment in the mathematical surveying exceeded those accomplished in the west by a millennium. He was the first Chinese mathematician to calculate π=3.1416 with his π algorithm. He discovered the usage of Cavalieri's principle to find an accurate formula for the volume of a cylinder, and also developed elements of the infinitesimal calculus during the 3rd century CE.

fraction interpolation for pi

In the fourth century, another influential mathematician named Zu Chongzhi, introduced the Da Ming Li. This calendar was specifically calculated to predict many cosmological cycles that will occur in a period of time. Very little is really known about his life. Today, the only sources are found in Book of Sui, we now know that Zu Chongzhi was one of the generations of mathematicians. He used Liu Hui's pi-algorithm applied to a 12288-gon and obtained a value of pi to 7 accurate decimal places (between 3.1415926 and 3.1415927), which would remain the most accurate approximation of π available for the next 900 years. He also applied He Chengtian's interpolation for approximating irrational number with fraction in his astronomy and mathematical works, he obtained $\tfrac{355}{113}$ as a good fraction approximate for pi; Yoshio Mikami commented that neither the Greeks, nor the Hindus nor Arabs knew about this fraction approximation to pi, not until the Dutch mathematician Adrian Anthoniszoom rediscovered it in 1585, "the Chinese had therefore been possessed of this the most extraordinary of all fractional values over a whole millennium earlier than Europe".

Along with his son, Zu Geng, Zu Chongzhi applied the Cavalieri's principle to find an accurate solution for calculating the volume of the sphere. Besides containing formulas for the volume of the sphere, his book also included formulas of cubic equations and the accurate value of pi. His work, Zhui Shu was discarded out of the syllabus of mathematics during the Song dynasty and lost. Many believed that Zhui Shu contains the formulas and methods for linear, matrix algebra, algorithm for calculating the value of π, formula for the volume of the sphere. The text should also associate with his astronomical methods of interpolation, which would contain knowledge, similar to our modern mathematics.

A mathematical manual called Sunzi mathematical classic dated between 200 and 400 CE contained the most detailed step by step description of multiplication and division algorithm with counting rods. Intriguingly, Sunzi may have influenced the development of place-value systems and place-value systems and the associated Galley division in the West. European sources learned place-value techniques in the 13th century, from a Latin translation an early-9th-century work by Al-Khwarizmi. Khwarizmi's presentation is almost identical to the division algorithm in Sunzi, even regarding stylistic matters (for example, using blank spaces to represent trailing zeros); the similarity suggests that the results may not have been an independent discovery. Islamic commentators on Al-Khwarizmi's work believed that it primarily summarized Hindu knowledge; Al-Khwarizmi's failure to cite his sources makes it difficult to determine whether those sources had in turn learned the procedure from China.

In the fifth century the manual called "Zhang Qiujian suanjing" discussed linear and quadratic equations. By this point the Chinese had the concept of negative numbers.

== Tang dynasty ==
By the Tang dynasty study of mathematics was fairly standard in the great schools. The Ten Computational Canons was a collection of ten Chinese mathematical works, compiled by early Tang dynasty mathematician Li Chunfeng (李淳風 602–670), as the official mathematical texts for imperial examinations in mathematics. The Sui dynasty and Tang dynasty ran the "School of Computations".

Wang Xiaotong was a great mathematician in the beginning of the Tang dynasty, and he wrote a book: Jigu Suanjing (Continuation of Ancient Mathematics), where numerical solutions which general cubic equations appear for the first time.

The Tibetans obtained their first knowledge of mathematics (arithmetic) from China during the reign of Nam-ri srong btsan, who died in 630.

The table of sines by the Indian mathematician, Aryabhata, were translated into the Chinese mathematical book of the Kaiyuan Zhanjing, compiled in 718 AD during the Tang dynasty. Although the Chinese excelled in other fields of mathematics such as solid geometry, binomial theorem, and complex algebraic formulas, early forms of trigonometry were not as widely appreciated as in the contemporary Indian and Islamic mathematics.

Yi Xing, the mathematician and Buddhist monk was credited for calculating the tangent table. Instead, the early Chinese used an empirical substitute known as chong cha, while practical use of plane trigonometry in using the sine, the tangent, and the secant were known. Yi Xing was famed for his genius, and was known to have calculated the number of possible positions on a go board game (though without a symbol for zero he had difficulties expressing the number).

== Song and Yuan dynasties ==
Northern Song dynasty mathematician Jia Xian developed an additive multiplicative method for extraction of square root and cubic root which implemented the "Horner" rule.

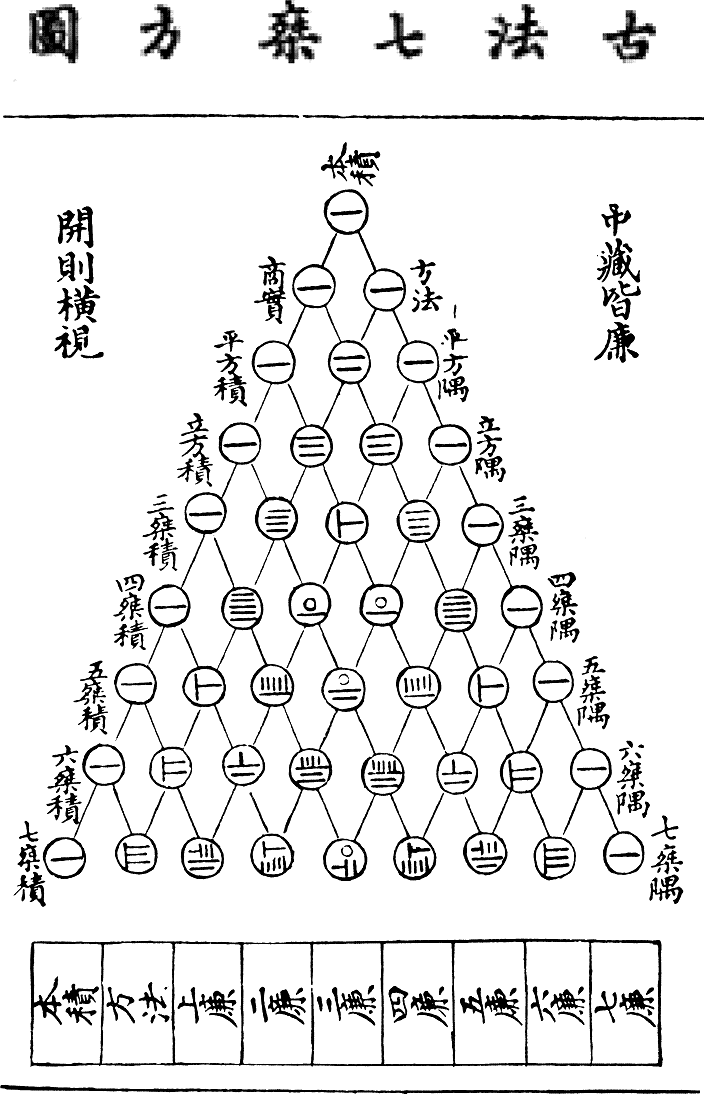
Yang Hui triangle (Pascal's triangle) using rod numerals, as depicted in a publication of Zhu Shijie in 1303 AD

Four outstanding mathematicians arose during the Song dynasty and Yuan dynasty, particularly in the twelfth and thirteenth centuries: Yang Hui, Qin Jiushao, Li Zhi (Li Ye), and Zhu Shijie. Yang Hui, Qin Jiushao, Zhu Shijie all used the Horner-Ruffini method six hundred years earlier to solve certain types of simultaneous equations, roots, quadratic, cubic, and quartic equations. Yang Hui was also the first person in history to discover and prove "Pascal's Triangle", along with its binomial proof (although the earliest mention of the Pascal's triangle in China exists before the eleventh century AD). Li Zhi on the other hand, investigated on a form of algebraic geometry based on tiān yuán shù. His book; Ceyuan haijing revolutionized the idea of inscribing a circle into triangles, by turning this geometry problem by algebra instead of the traditional method of using Pythagorean theorem. Guo Shoujing of this era also worked on spherical trigonometry for precise astronomical calculations. At this point of mathematical history, a lot of modern western mathematics were already discovered by Chinese mathematicians. Things grew quiet for a time until the thirteenth century Renaissance of Chinese math. This saw Chinese mathematicians solving equations with methods Europe would not know until the eighteenth century. The high point of this era came with Zhu Shijie's two books Suanxue qimeng and the Jade Mirror of the Four Unknowns. In one case he reportedly gave a method equivalent to Gauss's pivotal condensation.

Qin Jiushao (c. 1202 – 1261) was the first to introduce the zero symbol into Chinese mathematics." Before this innovation, blank spaces were used instead of zeros in the system of counting rods. One of the most important contribution of Qin Jiushao was his method of solving high order numerical equations. Referring to Qin's solution of a 4th order equation, Yoshio Mikami put it: "Who can deny the fact of Horner's illustrious process being used in China at least nearly six long centuries earlier than in Europe?" Qin also solved a 10th order equation.

Pascal's triangle was first illustrated in China by Yang Hui in his book Xiangjie Jiuzhang Suanfa (詳解九章算法), although it was described earlier around 1100 by Jia Xian. Although the Introduction to Computational Studies (算學啓蒙) written by Zhu Shijie (fl. 13th century) in 1299 contained nothing new in Chinese algebra, it had a great impact on the development of Japanese mathematics.

=== Algebra ===
==== Ceyuan haijing ====
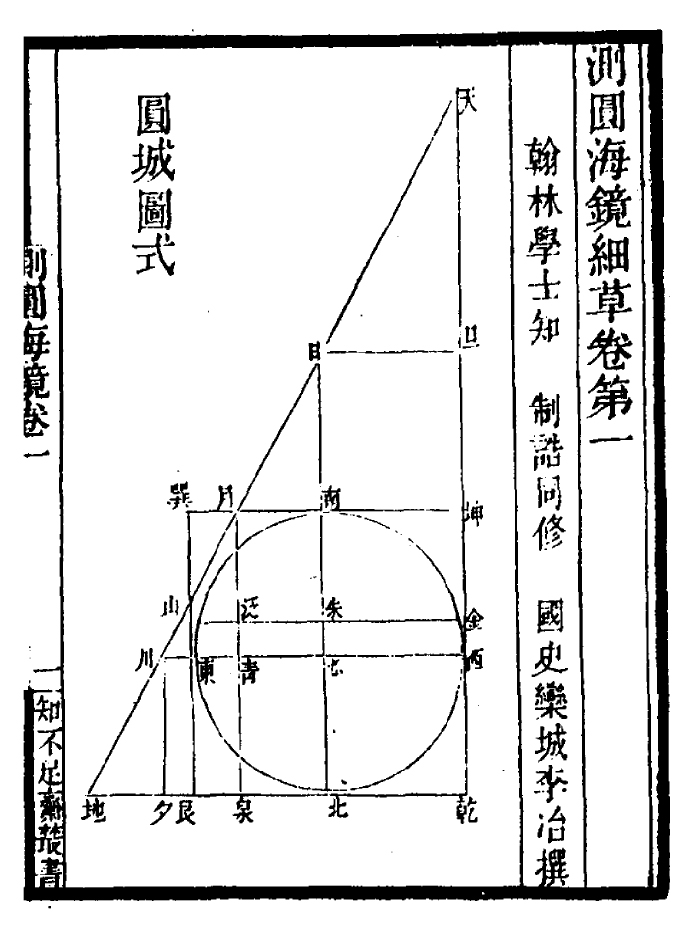
Li Ye's inscribed circle in triangle:Diagram of a round town

Yang Hui's magic concentric circles – numbers on each circle and diameter (ignoring the middle 9) sum to 138

Ceyuan haijing (Chinese: 測圓海鏡; pinyin: Cèyuán Hǎijìng), or Sea-Mirror of the Circle Measurements, is a collection of 692 formula and 170 problems related to inscribed circle in a triangle, written by Li Zhi (or Li Ye) (1192–1272 AD). He used Tian yuan shu to convert intricated geometry problems into pure algebra problems. He then used fan fa, or Horner's method, to solve equations of degree as high as six, although he did not describe his method of solving equations. "Li Chih (or Li Yeh, 1192–1279), a mathematician of Peking who was offered a government post by Khublai Khan in 1206, but politely found an excuse to decline it. His Ts'e-yuan hai-ching (Sea-Mirror of the Circle Measurements) includes 170 problems dealing with[...]some of the problems leading to polynomial equations of sixth degree. Although he did not describe his method of solution of equations, it appears that it was not very different from that used by Chu Shih-chieh and Horner. Others who used the Horner method were Ch'in Chiu-shao (ca. 1202 – ca.1261) and Yang Hui (fl. ca. 1261–1275).

==== Jade Mirror of the Four Unknowns ====
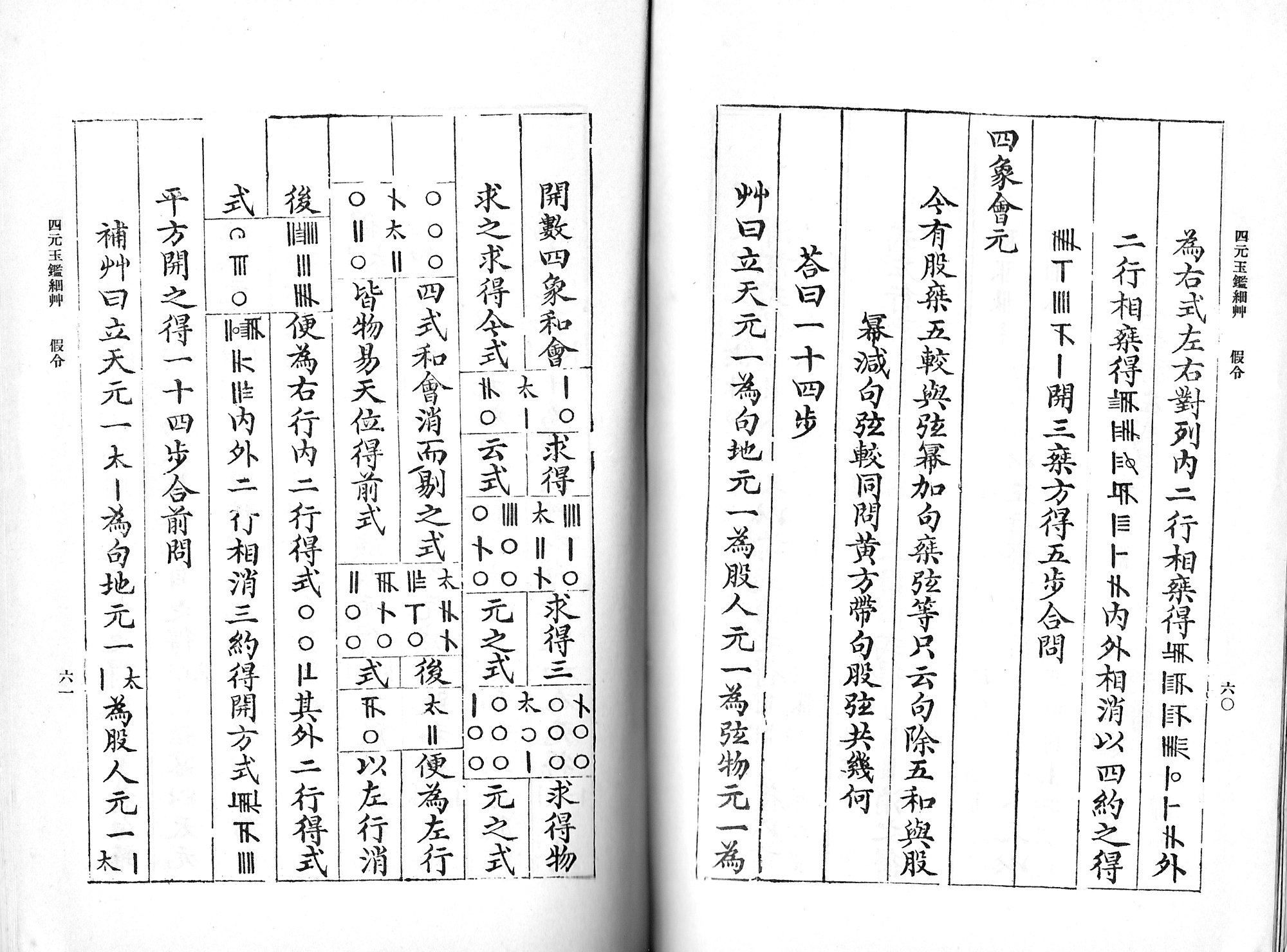
Facsimile of the Jade Mirror of Four Unknowns

The Jade Mirror of the Four Unknowns was written by Zhu Shijie in 1303 AD and marks the peak in the development of Chinese algebra. The four elements, called heaven, earth, man and matter, represented the four unknown quantities in his algebraic equations. It deals with simultaneous equations and with equations of degrees as high as fourteen. The author uses the method of fan fa, today called Horner's method, to solve these equations.

There are many summation series equations given without proof in the Mirror. A few of the summation series are:

$1^2 + 2^2 + 3^2 + \cdots + n^2 = {n(n + 1)(2n + 1)\over 3!}$ $1 + 8 + 30 + 80 + \cdots + {n^2(n + 1)(n + 2)\over 3!} = {n(n + 1)(n + 2)(n + 3)(4n + 1)\over 5!}$

==== Mathematical Treatise in Nine Sections ====
The Mathematical Treatise in Nine Sections, was written by the wealthy governor and minister Ch'in Chiu-shao (c. 1202 – c. 1261) and with the invention of a method of solving simultaneous congruences, it marks the high point in Chinese indeterminate analysis.

==== Magic squares and magic circles ====
The earliest known magic squares of order greater than three are attributed to Yang Hui (fl. ca. 1261–1275), who worked with magic squares of order as high as ten. "The same "Horner" device was used by Yang Hui, about whose life almost nothing is known and who work has survived only in part. Among his contributions that are extant are the earliest Chinese magic squares of order greater than three, including two each of orders four through eight and one each of orders nine and ten." He also worked with magic circle.

=== Trigonometry ===
The embryonic state of trigonometry in China slowly began to change and advance during the Song dynasty (960–1279), where Chinese mathematicians began to express greater emphasis for the need of spherical trigonometry in calendar science and astronomical calculations. The polymath and official Shen Kuo (1031–1095) used trigonometric functions to solve mathematical problems of chords and arcs. Joseph W. Dauben notes that in Shen's "technique of intersecting circles" formula, he creates an approximation of the arc of a circle s by s = c + 2v^{2}/d, where d is the diameter, v is the versine, c is the length of the chord c subtending the arc. Sal Restivo writes that Shen's work in the lengths of arcs of circles provided the basis for spherical trigonometry developed in the 13th century by the mathematician and astronomer Guo Shoujing (1231–1316). Gauchet and Needham state Guo used spherical trigonometry in his calculations to improve the Chinese calendar and astronomy. Along with a later 17th-century Chinese illustration of Guo's mathematical proofs, Needham writes:

Guo used a quadrangular spherical pyramid, the basal quadrilateral of which consisted of one equatorial and one ecliptic arc, together with two meridian arcs, one of which passed through the summer solstice point...By such methods he was able to obtain the du lü (degrees of equator corresponding to degrees of ecliptic), the ji cha (values of chords for given ecliptic arcs), and the cha lü (difference between chords of arcs differing by 1 degree).

Despite the achievements of Shen and Guo's work in trigonometry, another substantial work in Chinese trigonometry would not be published again until 1607, with the dual publication of Euclid's Elements by Chinese official and astronomer Xu Guangqi (1562–1633) and the Italian Jesuit Matteo Ricci (1552–1610).

== Ming dynasty ==
After the overthrow of the Yuan dynasty, China became suspicious of Mongol-favored knowledge. The court turned away from math and physics in favor of botany and pharmacology. Imperial examinations included little mathematics, and what little they included ignored recent developments. Martzloff writes:

At the end of the 16th century, Chinese autochthonous mathematics known by the Chinese themselves amounted to almost nothing, little more than calculation on the abacus, whilst in the 17th and 18th centuries nothing could be paralleled with the revolutionary progress in the theatre of European science. Moreover, at this same period, no one could report what had taken place in the more distant past, since the Chinese themselves only had a fragmentary knowledge of that. One should not forget that, in China itself, autochthonous mathematics was not rediscovered on a large scale prior to the last quarter of the 18th century.

Correspondingly, scholars paid less attention to mathematics; preeminent mathematicians such as Gu Yingxiang and Tang Shunzhi appear to have been ignorant of the 'increase multiply' method. Without oral interlocutors to explicate them, the texts rapidly became incomprehensible; worse yet, most problems could be solved with more elementary methods. To the average scholar, then, tianyuan seemed numerology. When Wu Jing collated all the mathematical works of previous dynasties into The Annotations of Calculations in the Nine Chapters on the Mathematical Art, he omitted Tian yuan shu and the increase multiply method.

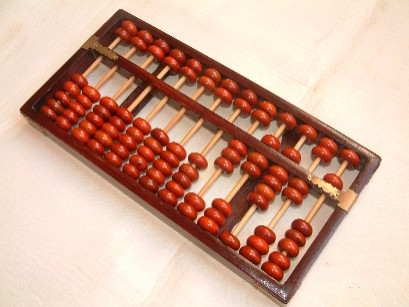
An abacus

Instead, mathematical progress became focused on computational tools. In 15 century, abacus came into its suan pan form. Easy to use and carry, both fast and accurate, it rapidly overtook rod calculus as the preferred form of computation. Zhusuan, the arithmetic calculation through abacus, inspired multiple new works. Suanfa Tongzong (General Source of Computational Methods), a 17-volume work published in 1592 by Cheng Dawei, remained in use for over 300 years. Zhu Zaiyu, Prince of Zheng used 81 position abacus to calculate the square root and cubic root of 2 to 25 figure accuracy, a precision that enabled his development of the equal-temperament system.

In the late 16th century, Matteo Ricci decided to published Western scientific works in order to establish a position at the Imperial Court. With the assistance of Xu Guangqi, he was able to translate Euclid's Elements using the same techniques used to teach classical Buddhist texts. Other missionaries followed in his example, translating Western works on special functions (trigonometry and logarithms) that were neglected in the Chinese tradition. However, contemporary scholars found the emphasis on proofs — as opposed to solved problems — baffling, and most continued to work from classical texts alone.

== Qing dynasty ==
Under the Kangxi Emperor, who learned Western mathematics from the Jesuits and was open to outside knowledge and ideas, Chinese mathematics enjoyed a brief period of official support. At Kangxi's direction, Mei Goucheng and three other outstanding mathematicians compiled a 53-volume work titled Shuli Jingyun ("The Essence of Mathematical Study") which was printed in 1723, and gave a systematic introduction to western mathematical knowledge. At the same time, Mei Goucheng also developed to Meishi Congshu Jiyang [The Compiled works of Mei]. Meishi Congshu Jiyang was an encyclopedic summary of nearly all schools of Chinese mathematics at that time, but it also included the cross-cultural works of Mei Wending (1633–1721), Goucheng's grandfather. The enterprise sought to alleviate the difficulties for Chinese mathematicians working on Western mathematics in tracking down citations.

In 1773, the Qianlong Emperor decided to compile the Complete Library of the Four Treasuries (or Siku Quanshu). Dai Zhen (1724–1777) selected and proofread The Nine Chapters on the Mathematical Art from Yongle Encyclopedia and several other mathematical works from Han and Tang dynasties. The long-missing mathematical works from Song and Yuan dynasties such as Si-yüan yü-jian and Ceyuan haijing were also found and printed, which directly led to a wave of new research. The most annotated works were Jiuzhang suanshu xicaotushuo (The Illustrations of Calculation Process for The Nine Chapters on the Mathematical Art ) contributed by Li Huang and Siyuan yujian xicao (The Detailed Explanation of Si-yuan yu-jian) by Luo Shilin.

== Western influences ==
In 1840, the First Opium War forced China to open its door and look at the outside world, which also led to an influx of western mathematical studies at a rate unrivaled in the previous centuries. In 1852, the Chinese mathematician Li Shanlan and the British missionary Alexander Wylie co-translated the later nine volumes of Elements and 13 volumes on Algebra. With the assistance of Joseph Edkins, more works on astronomy and calculus soon followed. Chinese scholars were initially unsure whether to approach the new works: was study of Western knowledge a form of submission to foreign invaders? But by the end of the century, it became clear that China could only begin to recover its sovereignty by incorporating Western works. Chinese scholars, taught in Western missionary schools, from (translated) Western texts, rapidly lost touch with the indigenous tradition. Those who were self-trained or in traditionalist circles nevertheless continued to work within the traditional framework of algorithmic mathematics without resorting to Western symbolism. Yet, as Martzloff notes, "from 1911 onwards, solely Western mathematics has been practised in China."

=== In modern China ===
Chinese mathematics experienced a great surge of revival following the establishment of a modern Chinese republic in 1912. Ever since then, modern Chinese mathematicians have made numerous achievements in various mathematical fields.

Some famous modern ethnic Chinese mathematicians include:

- Shiing-Shen Chern was widely regarded as a leader in geometry and one of the greatest mathematicians of the 20th century and was awarded the Wolf Prize for his contributions to mathematics.
- Ky Fan made contributions to fixed point theory, in addition to influencing nonlinear functional analysis, which have found wide application in mathematical economics and game theory, potential theory, calculus of variations, and differential equations.
- Shing-Tung Yau, a Fields Medal laureate, has influenced both physics and mathematics, and he has been active at the interface between geometry and theoretical physics and subsequently awarded the for his contributions.
- Terence Tao, a Fields Medal laureate and child prodigy of Chinese heritage, was the youngest participant in the history of the International Mathematical Olympiad at the age of 10, winning a bronze, silver, and gold medal. He remains the youngest winner of each of the three medals in the Olympiad's history.
- Yitang Zhang, a number theorist who established the first finite bound on gaps between prime numbers.
- Chen Jingrun, a number theorist who proved that every sufficiently large even number can be written as the sum of either two primes, or a prime and a semiprime, which is now called Chen's theorem. His work was important for research of Goldbach's conjecture.

== People's Republic of China ==
In 1949, at the beginning of the founding of the People's Republic of China, the government paid great attention to the cause of science although the country was in a predicament of lack of funds. The Chinese Academy of Sciences was established in November 1949. The Institute of Mathematics was formally established in July 1952. Then, the Chinese Mathematical Society and its founding journals restored and added other special journals. In the 18 years after 1949, the number of published papers accounted for more than three times the total number of articles before 1949. Many of them not only filled the gaps in China's past, but also reached the world's advanced level.

During the chaos of the Cultural Revolution, the sciences declined. In the field of mathematics, in addition to Chen Jingrun, Hua Luogeng, Zhang Guanghou and other mathematicians struggling to continue their work. After the catastrophe, with the publication of Guo Moruo's literary "Spring of Science", Chinese sciences and mathematics experienced a revival. In 1977, a new mathematical development plan was formulated in Beijing, the work of the mathematics society was resumed, the journal was re-published, the academic journal was published, the mathematics education was strengthened, and basic theoretical research was strengthened.

An important mathematical achievement of the Chinese mathematician in the direction of the power system is how Xia Zhihong proved the Painleve conjecture in 1988. When there are some initial states of N celestial bodies, one of the celestial bodies ran to infinity or speed in a limited time. Infinity is reached, that is, there are non-collision singularities. The Painleve conjecture is an important conjecture in the field of power systems proposed in 1895. A very important recent development for the 4-body problem is that Xue Jinxin and Dolgopyat proved a non-collision singularity in a simplified version of the 4-body system around 2013.

In addition, in 2007, Shen Weixiao and Kozlovski, Van-Strien proved the Real Fatou conjecture: Real hyperbolic polynomials are dense in the space of real polynomials with fixed degree. This conjecture can be traced back to Fatou in the 1920s, and later Smale posed it in the 1960s. The proof of Real Fatou conjecture is one of the most important developments in conformal dynamics in the past decade.

=== IMO performance ===
In comparison to other participating countries at the International Mathematical Olympiad, China has highest team scores and has won the all-members-gold IMO with a full team the most number of times.

== In education ==
The first reference to a book being used in learning mathematics in China is dated to the second century CE (Hou Hanshu: 24, 862; 35,1207). Ma Xu, who is a youth c. 110, and Zheng Xuan (127–200) both studied the Nine Chapters on Mathematical procedures. Christopher Cullen claims that mathematics, in a manner akin to medicine, was taught orally. The stylistics of the Suàn shù shū from Zhangjiashan suggest that the text was assembled from various sources and then underwent codification.

== See also ==
- Chinese astronomy
- History of mathematics
  - Indian mathematics
  - Islamic mathematics
  - Japanese mathematics
- List of Chinese discoveries
- List of Chinese mathematicians
- Numbers in Chinese culture
