= 算盤 =

算盤 or 算盘 is an East Asian abacus, and may refer to:

- Suanpan, an abacus of Chinese origin
- Soroban, an abacus developed in Japan, and derived from the suanpan
