= Book on Numbers and Computation =

Chinese anthology text (202–186 BC)

The Book on Numbers and Computation (Chinese: 筭數書; pinyin: Suàn shù shū), or the Writings on Reckoning, is one of the earliest known Chinese mathematical treatises. It was written during the early Western Han dynasty, sometime between 202 BC and 186 BC. It was preserved among the Zhangjiashan Han bamboo texts and contains similar mathematical problems and principles found in the later Eastern Han period text of The Nine Chapters on the Mathematical Art.

== Discovery ==
The text was found in tomb M247 of the burial grounds near Zhangjiashan, Jiangling County, in Hubei province, excavated in December–January 1983–1984. This tomb belonged to an anonymous civil servant in early West Han dynasty. In the tomb were 1200 bamboo strips written in ink. Originally the strips were bound together with string, but the string had rotted away and it took Chinese scholars 17 years to piece together the strips. As well as the mathematical work the strips covered government statutes, law reports and therapeutic gymnastics.

On the back of the sixth strip, the top has a black square mark, followed by the three characters 筭數書, which serve as the title of the rolled up book.

== Content ==
The Book on Numbers and Computation consists of 200 strips of bamboo written in ink, 180 strips are intact, the others have rotted. They consist of 69 mathematical problems from a variety of sources, two names Mr Wáng and Mr Yáng were found, probably two of the writers. Each problem has a question, an answer, followed by a method. The problems cover elementary arithmetic; fractions; inverse proportion; factorization of numbers; geometric progressions, in particular interest rate calculations and handling of errors; conversion between different units; the false position method for finding roots and the extraction of approximate square roots; calculation of the volume of various 3-dimensional shapes; relative dimensions of a square and its inscribed circle; calculation of unknown side of rectangle, given area and one side. All the calculations about circumference and area of circle are approximate, equivalent to taking π = 3. Calculations of pi were made more accurate with the work of Liu Xin (c. 46 BC – 23 AD), Zhang Heng (78–139 AD), Liu Hui (fl. 3rd century AD), and Zu Chongzhi (429–500).

Prior to discovery the oldest Chinese mathematical text were the Zhoubi Suanjing and The Nine Chapters on the Mathematical Art which dates from around 100 CE. Many topics are covered in both texts, however, error correction problems only appear in the Book on Numbers and Computation, and the last two chapter of the nine chapters have no corresponding material in the Book on Numbers and Computation.

The text has been translated to English by Christopher Cullen, director of the Needham Research Institute.
