= Christopher Cullen =

English sinologist

Christopher Cullen is an English sinologist born in 1946. He has an MA from University of Oxford in engineering and a PhD from the School of Oriental and African Studies in classical Chinese. He is Director Emeritus of the Needham Research Institute and General Editor of the Science and Civilisation in China series, succeeding Joseph Needham. His own area of research is the Han Dynasty and he translated the Book on Numbers and Computation into English.

== Publications ==
- Cullen, Christopher (1996). Astronomy and Mathematics in Ancient China: The Zhou Bi Suan Jing. Cambridge; New York: Cambridge University Press. ISBN 0521550890.
- —— (1980). "Joseph Needham on Chinese Astronomy". Past & Present (87): 39–53. JSTOR 650565.
- --, and Vivienne Lo, eds., Medieval Chinese Medicine: The Dunhuang Medical Manuscripts. Taylor & Francis, Needham Research Institute Series, 2004. ISBN 9781134291311.
