= Cheng Dawei =

Chinese mathematician

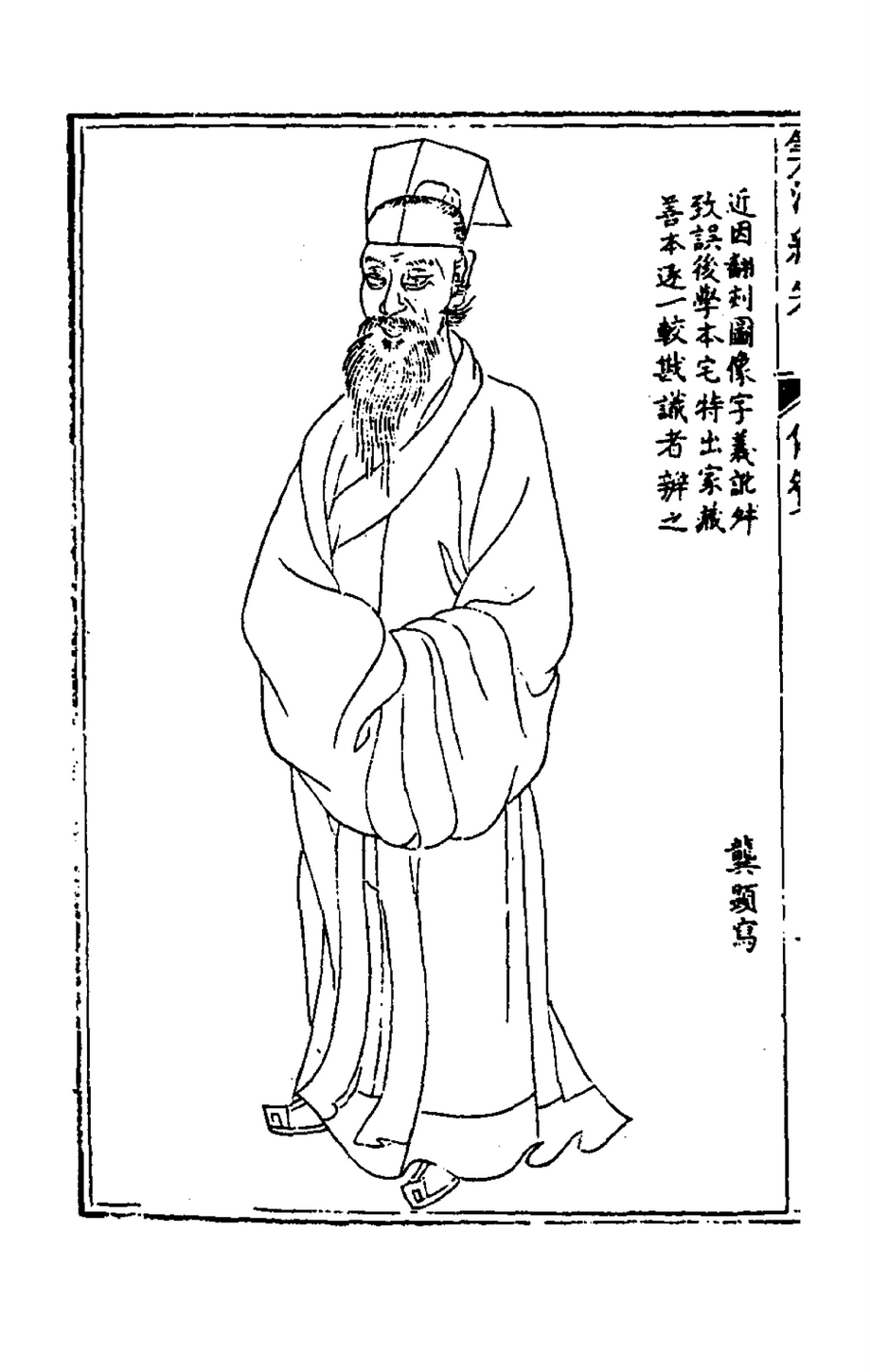
Image of Cheng Dewei

Cheng Dawei (程大位, 1533–1606), also known as Da Wei Cheng or Ch'eng Ta-wei, was a Chinese mathematician and writer who was known mainly as the author of Suanfa Tongzong (算法統宗) (General Source of Computational Methods). He has been described as "the most illustrious Chinese arithmetician."

Almost all that is known about his life is contained in a passage written in the Preface of the book by one of his descendants when the book was being reprinted:

In his youth my ancestor Cheng Da Wei was academically gifted, but although he was well versed in scholarly matters, he continued to carry out his profession as a sincere Local Agent, without becoming a scholar. He never lagged behind either on the classics or on ancient writings with old style characters, but was particularly gifted in arithmetic. In the prime of his life he visited the fairs of Wu and Chu. When he came across books that talked about "square fields" or "grain with the husk removed" ... he never looked at the price before purchasing them. He questioned respectable old men who were experienced in the practice of arithmetic and gradually and indefatigably formed his own collection of difficult problems.

Cheng Dawei was not a professional mathematician. From the description cited above, one could deduce that he must have traveled widely. Also must have been well off since he purchased books without asking the price. Again we can see that he was an avid collector of books on mathematics. This is borne out by the contents of his work General Source of Computational Methods which is essentially a compilation of problems from earlier works.

== General Source of Computational Methods ==
The General Source of Computational Methods was first published in 1592. It is essentially a general arithmetic for the abacus. Though there is nothing particularly original about this book, it was republished several times and became widely popular. Beyond the limited circle of mathematicians, it must have reached a vast popular audience. Its popularity must have continued to modern times as can be seen from a remark by a contemporary historian of Chinese mathematics: "Nowadays, various editions of the book can still be found in China and old people still recite the versified formulas and talk about the difficult problems in it."

The book contains 595 problems divided into 12 chapters. According to Jean Claude Martzloff, historian of Chinese mathematics, "... unlike the authors of the venerable classic, Cheng Dawei was not afraid of superfluity or verbosity. His book is an encyclopaedic hotch-potch of ideas which contains everything from A to Z relating to the Chinese mystique of numbers (magic squares, ... generation of the eight trigrams, musical tubes), how computation should be taught and studied, the meaning of technical arithmetical terms, computation on the abacus with its tables which must be learnt by heart, the history of Chinese mathematics, mathematical recreations and mathematical curiosities of all types."

The book provided a poem to solve a remainder problem.

       三人同行七十稀，   (Divide it by 3 and multiply the remainder by 70.)
       五树梅花廿一枝；   (Divide it by 5 and multiply the remainder by 21.) 
       七子团圆正半月，   (Divide it by 7 and multiply the remainder by 15.) 
       除百零五便得知。   (Adjust the sum by subtracting or adding multiple of 105, LCM of 3, 5 and 7.)

== Cheng Dawei Abacus Museum ==
In the Huangshan City in southern Anhui province in, there is a museum for abacuses named after Cheng Dawei. There are more than 1,000 abacuses and 3,000 copies of related materials displayed in the showcases. These abacuses are made of gold, silver, ivory, jade, stone, hard wood respectively with different shapes.

== See also ==
- Chinese Zhusuan
