= Suanfa tongzong =

Suanfa tongzong (Chinese: 算法統宗) is a mathematical text written by sixteenth century Chinese mathematician Cheng Dawei (1533–1606) and published in the year 1592. The book contains 595 problems divided into 17 chapters. The book is essentially general arithmetic for the abacus. The book was the main source available to scholars concerning mathematics as it developed in China's tradition. Six years after the publication of Suanfa Tongzong, Cheng Dawei published another book titled Suanfa Zuanyao (A Compendium of calculating Methods). About 90% of the content of the new book came from the contents of four chapters of the first book with some rearrangement. It is said that when Suanfa Tongzong was first published, it sold so many copies that the cost of paper went up and the lucrative sales resulted in unscrupulous people beginning to print pirated copies of the book with many errors. It was this that forced the author to print an abridged version.

== Some features ==
Suanfa Tongzong has some noteworthy features. As Jean-Claude Martzloff, a historian of Chinese mathematics has observed, it is an encyclopedic hotch-potch of ideas which contains everything from A to Z relating to the Chinese mystique of numbers. There are sections in the book which explains how computation should be taught and studied. The book is considered as an authoritative text on Chinese Zhusuan which is the knowledge and practices of arithmetic calculation through the abacus. There are descriptions of topics generally thought of as mathematical recreations and mathematical curiosities of different types. In particular, the book contains descriptions of several different types of magic circles. There is a collection of problems without solutions given as challenges to the readers. Also, some of the formulas and some of the problems are presented in verse for easy remembrance.

Magic circles and squares in Suanfa Tongzong

== Some sample problems ==
The following is a list of sample problems appearing in the book:

- "Boy shepherd B with his one sheep behind him asked shepherd A "Are there 100 sheep in your flock?". Shepherd A replies "Yet add the same flock, the same flock again, half, one quarter flock and your sheep. There are then 100 sheep altogether."
- "Now a pile of rice is against the wall with a base circumference 60 chi and an altitude of 12 chi. What is the volume? Another pile is at an inner corner, with a base circumference of 30 chi and an altitude of 12 chi. What is the volume? Another pile is at an outer corner, with base circumference of 90 chi and an altitude of 12 chi. What is the volume?"
- "A small river cuts right across a circular field whose area is unknown. Given the diameter of the field and the breadth of the river find the area of the non-flooded part of the field."
- "In the right-angled triangle with sides of length a, b, and c with a > b > c, we know that a + b = 81 and a + c = 72. Find a, b, and c."

== Popularity of the book ==
After its first publication in 1592, it was republished several times later and it became widely popular. Practically everybody who is involved in mathematics had a copy of the book. It was popular even beyond the limited circle of people interested in mathematics. Even in the mid-20th century (1964), the well-known historians of Chinese mathematics Li Yan and Du Shiran remarked that: "Nowadays, various editions of the Suanfa Tongzong can still be found throughout China and some old people still recite the versified formulae and talk to each other about its difficult problems."
