= Mahouton Norbert Hounkonnou =

Beninese mathematician

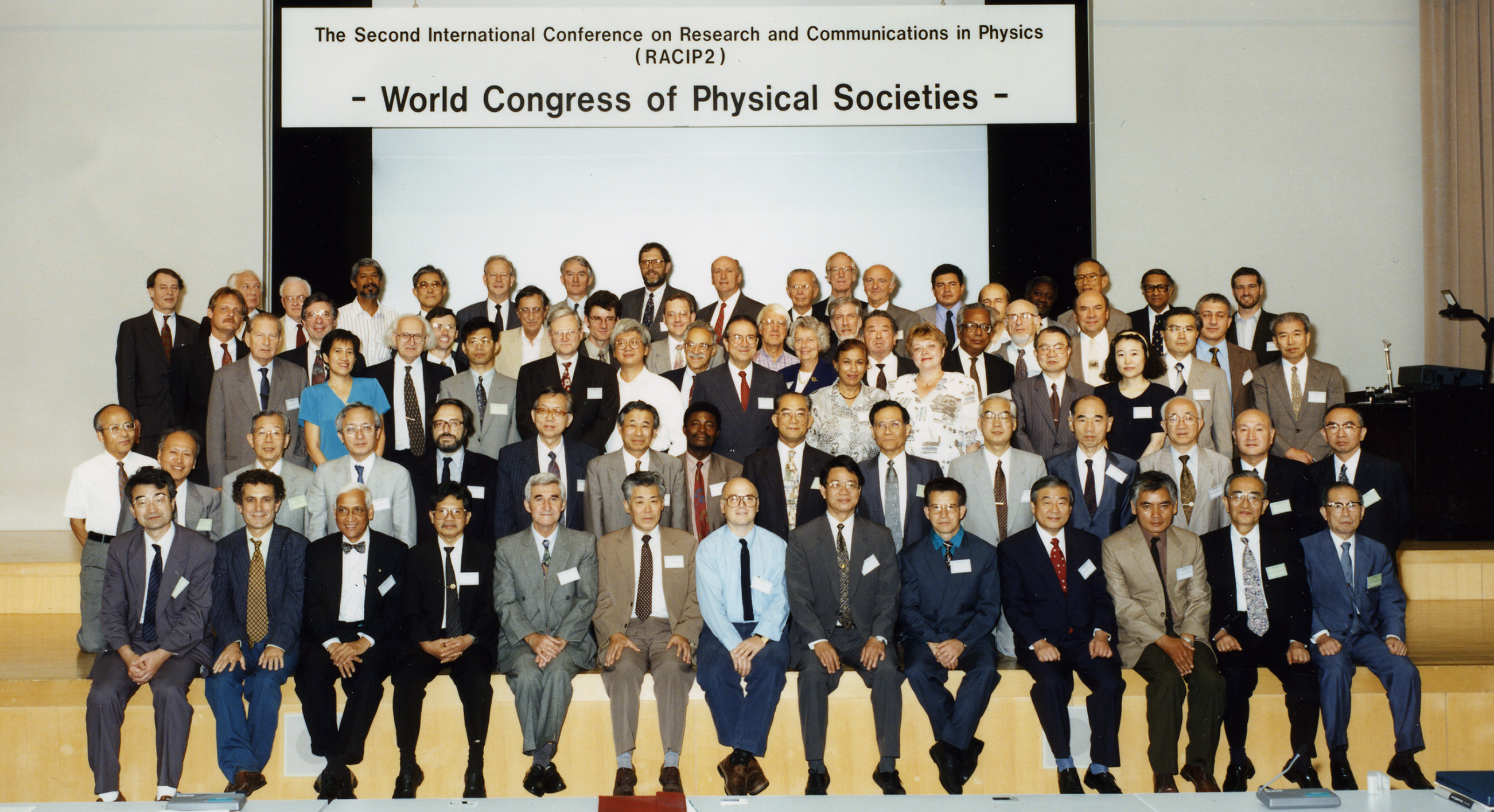
- Hounkonnou at the Second International Conference on Research and Communications in Physics
- Born: 7 June 1956; Adjohoun, Benin
- Occupation(s): Professor, mathematician, physicist and writer
- Website: https://hounkonnou.bj/

Mahouton Norbert Hounkonnou is a Beninese professor, mathematician, physicist and writer. He is professor of Mathematics and Physics at the University of Abomey-Calavi, the president of the Benin National Academy of Sciences, Arts and Letters, and a member of the African Academy of Sciences and the World Academy of Sciences.

== Selected works ==
- 2013, R (p, q)-calculus: differentiation and integration, MN Hounkonnou, J Désiré, B Kyemba, SUT J. Math 49 (2), 145-167
- 2012, Modeling the influence of local environmental factors on malaria transmission in Benin and its implications for cohort study, G Cottrell, B Kouwaye, C Pierrat, A Le Port, A Bouraïma, N Fonton, ..., PLOS ONE 7 (1), e28812
- 1992, Liquid chlorine in shear and elongational flows: A nonequilibrium molecular dynamics study, MN Hounkonnou, C Pierleoni, JP Ryckaert, The Journal of chemical physics 97 (12), 9335-9344
