= Suanpan =

Chinese abacus

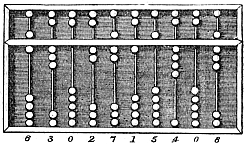
Suanpan (the number represented in the picture is 6,302,715,408)

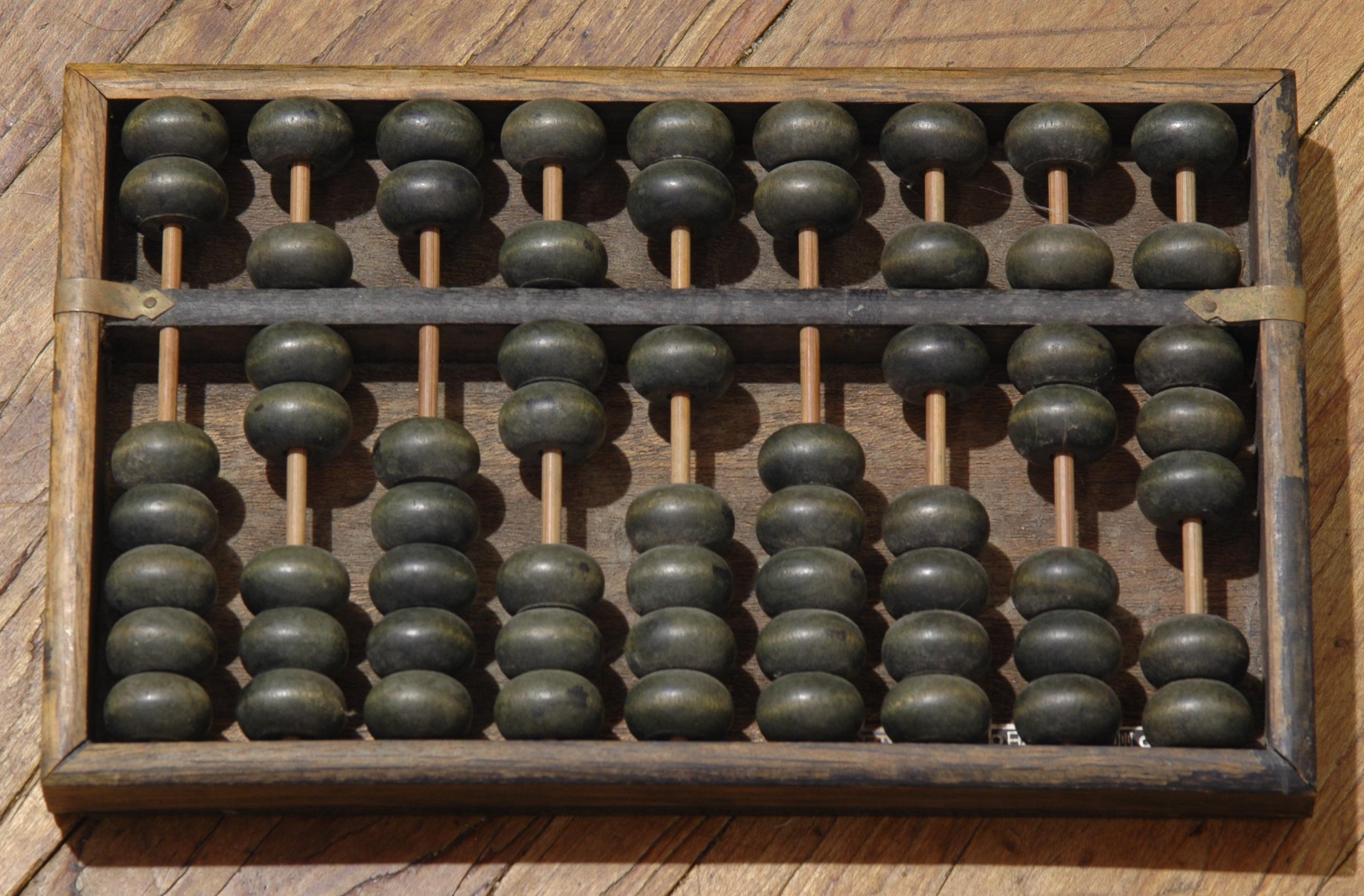
Chinese Abacus

An extended version of a suanpan

Suanpan- reincarnation of counting rods

The suanpan (simplified Chinese: 算盘; traditional Chinese: 算盤; pinyin: suànpán), also spelled suan pan or souanpan) is an abacus of Chinese origin. The earliest known written documentation of the Chinese abacus dates to the 2nd century BCE during the Han dynasty, and it was later described in a 190 CE book of the Eastern Han dynasty, namely Supplementary Notes on the Art of Figures written by Xu Yue. However, the exact design of this suanpan is not known. Usually, a suanpan is about 20 cm (8 in) tall and it comes in various widths depending on the application. It usually has more than seven rods. There are two beads on each rod in the upper deck and five beads on each rod in the bottom deck. The beads are usually rounded and made of a hardwood. The beads are counted by moving them up or down towards the beam. The suanpan can be reset to the starting position instantly by a quick jerk around the horizontal axis to spin all the beads away from the horizontal beam at the center.

Suanpans can be used for functions other than counting. Unlike the simple counting board used in elementary schools, very efficient suanpan techniques have been developed to do multiplication, division, addition, subtraction, square root and cube root operations at high speed.

The modern suanpan has 4+1 beads, colored beads to indicate position and a clear-all button. When the clear-all button is pressed, two mechanical levers push the top row beads to the top position and the bottom row beads to the bottom position, thus clearing all numbers to zero. This replaces clearing the beads by hand, or quickly rotating the suanpan around its horizontal center line to clear the beads by centrifugal force.

== History ==
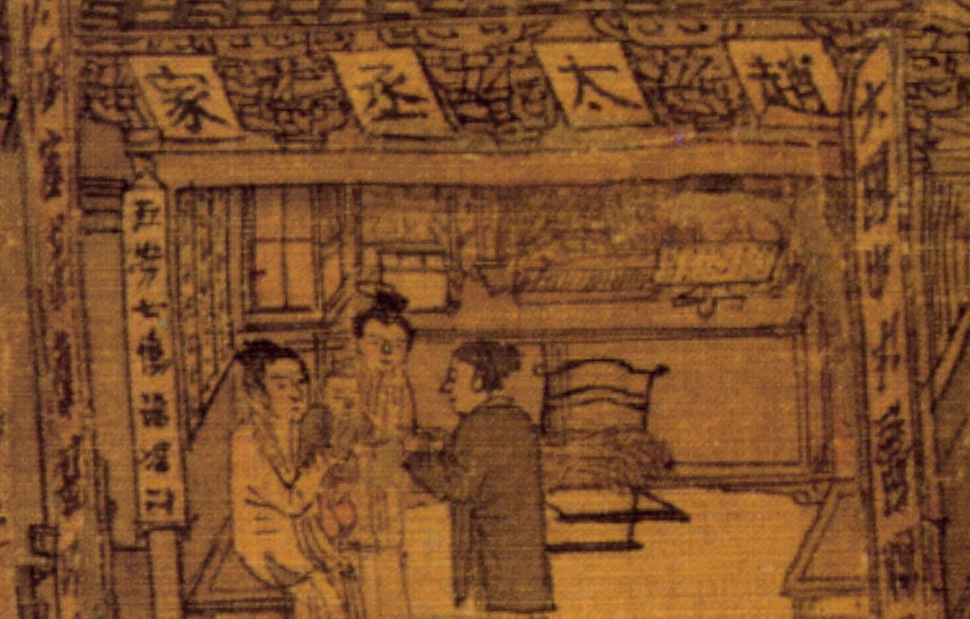
Suanpan on the apothecary's counter in Along the River During the Qingming Festival painting

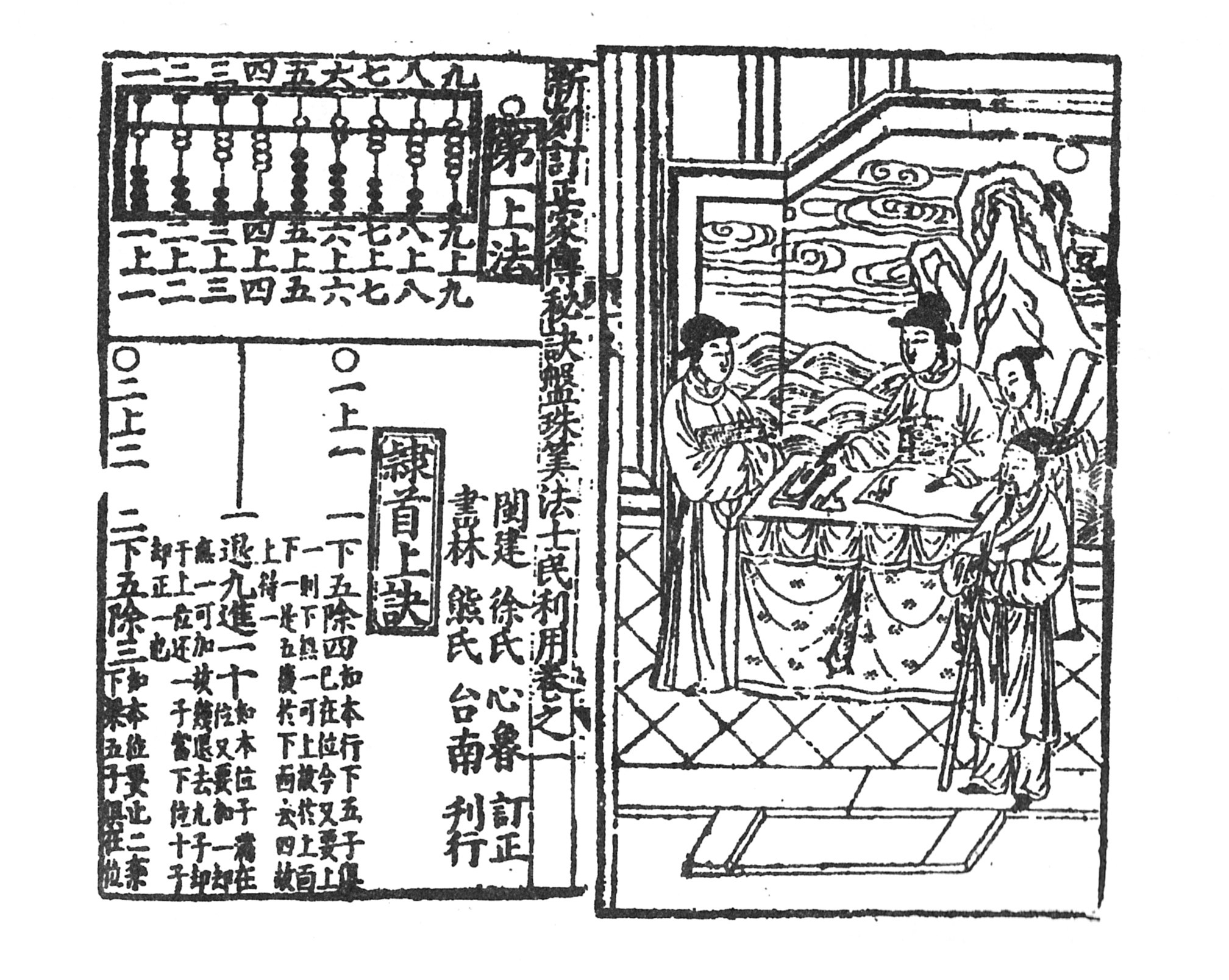
1573 Ming dynasty style suanpan

The word "abacus" was first mentioned by Xu Yue (160–220) in his book suanshu jiyi (算数记遗), or Notes on Traditions of Arithmetic Methods, in the Han dynasty. As it described, the original abacus had five beads (suan zhu) bunched by a stick in each column, separated by a transverse rod, and arrayed in a wooden rectangle box. One in the upper part represents five and each of four in the lower part represents one. People move the beads to do the calculation.

The long scroll Along the River During Qing Ming Festival painted by Zhang Zeduan (1085–1145) during the Song dynasty (960–1279) might contain a suanpan beside an account book and doctor's prescriptions on the counter of an apothecary. However, the identification of the object as an abacus is a matter of some debate.

Zhusuan was an abacus invented in China at the end of the 2nd century CE and reached its peak during the period from the 13th to the 16th century CE. In the 13th century, Guo Shoujing (郭守敬) used Zhusuan to calculate the length of each orbital year and found it to be 365.2425 days. In the 16th century, Zhu Zaiyu (朱載堉) calculated the musical Twelve-interval Equal Temperament using Zhusuan. And again in the 16th century, Wang Wensu (王文素) and Cheng Dawei (程大位) wrote respectively Principles of Algorithms and General Rules of Calculation, summarizing and refining the mathematical algorithms of Zhusuan, thus further boosting the popularity and promotion of Zhusuan. At the end of the 16th century, Zhusuan was introduced to neighboring countries and regions.

A 5+1 suanpan appeared in the Ming dynasty, an illustration in a 1573 book on suanpan showed a suanpan with one bead on top and five beads at the bottom.

The evident similarity of the Roman abacus to the Chinese one suggests that one may have inspired the other, as there is strong evidence of a trade relationship between the Roman Empire and China. However, no direct connection can be demonstrated, and the similarity of the abaci could be coincidental, both ultimately arising from counting with five fingers per hand. Where the Roman model and Chinese model (like most modern Japanese) has 4 plus 1 bead per decimal place, the old version of the Chinese suanpan has 5 plus 2, allowing less challenging arithmetic algorithms. Instead of running on wires as in the Chinese and Japanese models, the beads of Roman model run in grooves, presumably more reliable since the wires could be bent.

Another possible source of the suanpan is Chinese counting rods, which operated with a place value decimal system with empty spot as zero.

Although sinologist Nathan Sivin claimed that the abacus, with its limited flexibility, "was useless for the most advanced algebra", and suggested that "the convenience of the abacus" may have paradoxically stymied mathematical innovation from the 14th to 17th centuries, Roger Hart counters that the abacus in fact facilitated new developments during that time, such as Zhu Zaiyu's treatises on musical equal temperament, for which he used nine abacuses to calculate √200 to twenty-five digits.

== Beads ==
There are two types of beads on the suanpan, those in the lower deck, below the separator beam, and those in the upper deck above it. The ones in the lower deck are sometimes called earth beads or water beads, and carry a value of 1 in their column. The ones in the upper deck are sometimes called heaven beads and carry a value of 5 in their column. The columns are much like the places in Indian numerals: one of the columns, usually the rightmost, represents the ones place; to the left of it are the tens, hundreds, thousands place, and so on, and if there are any columns to the right of it, they are the tenths place, hundredths place, and so on.

The suanpan is a 2:5 abacus: two heaven beads and five earth beads. If one compares the suanpan to the soroban which is a 1:4 abacus, one might think there are two "extra" beads in each column. In fact, to represent decimal numbers and add or subtract such numbers, one strictly needs only one upper bead and four lower beads on each column. Some "old" methods to multiply or divide decimal numbers use those extra beads like the "Extra Bead technique" or "Suspended Bead technique".

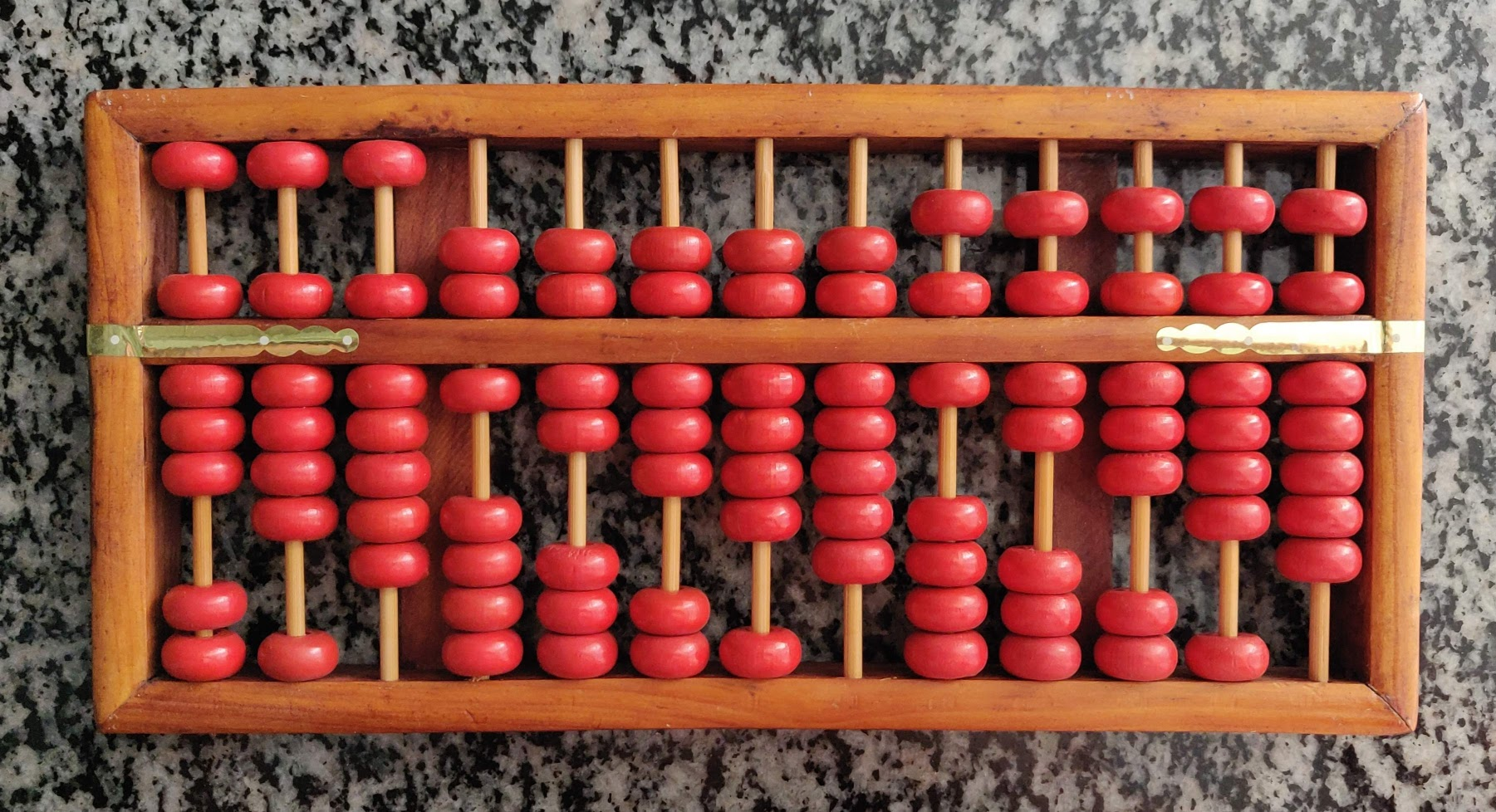
Suanpan showing 8 to 20 illustrating the use of "extra" and "suspended" beads

The most mysterious and seemingly superfluous fifth lower bead, likely inherited from counting rods as suggested by the image above, was used to simplify and speed up addition and subtraction somewhat, as well as to decrease the chances of error. Its use was demonstrated, for example, in the first book devoted entirely to suanpan: Computational Methods with the Beads in a Tray (Pánzhū Suànfǎ 盤珠算法) by Xú Xīnlǔ 徐心魯 (1573, Late Ming dynasty).

A simplify explanation on how to use the 5th beads is shown here.

The following two animations show the details of this particular usage:

Use of the 5th lower bead in addition according to the Panzhu Suanfa

Use of the 5th lower bead in subtraction according to the Panzhu Suanfa

The beads and rods are often lubricated to ensure quick, smooth motion.

== Calculating on a suanpan ==
At the end of a decimal calculation on a suanpan, it is never the case that all five beads in the lower deck are moved. Compared with the Chinese abacus, Japanese Sorobans can accommodate up to 9 in each digit rod and when it becomes 10, the digit rod changes that will visualise the Decimal system bead in the top deck takes their place. Similarly, if two beads in the top deck are pushed down, they are pushed back up, and one carry bead in the lower deck of the next column to the left is moved up. The result of the computation is read off from the beads clustered near the separator beam between the upper and lower deck. In the past, the Chinese used the traditional system of measurements called the Shì yòng zhì (市用制) for its suanpan.

In Shì yòng zhì (市用制), the unit of weight, the jīn (斤), was defined as 16 liǎng (兩), which made it necessary to perform calculations in hexadecimal. The Suanpan can accommodate up to 15 in each digit rod and when it becomes 16, the digit rod changes that will visualise the hexadecimal system.

This is the reason why the Japanese Soroban's 4 earth beads (when the value is 0) is one bead apart from the beam while the suanpan's 5 earth beads (when the value is 0) are 2 beads apart from its beam.

=== Division ===
There exist different methods to perform division on the suanpan. Some of them require the use of the so-called "Chinese division table".

Chinese Division Table
	一 1	二 2	三 3	四 4	五 5	六 6	七 7	八 8	九 9
一 1	进一 advance 1	Cycle repeats							
二 2	添作五 replace by 5	进一 advance 1	Cycle repeats						
三 3	三十一; 31	六十二; 62	进一 advance 1	Cycle repeats					
四 4	二十二; 22	添作五 replace by 5	七十二; 72	进一 advance 1	Cycle repeats				
五 5	添作二 replace by 2	添作四 replace by 4	添作六 replace by 6	添作八 replace by 8	进一 advance 1	Cycle repeats			
六 6	下加四 below add 4	三十二; 32	添作五 replace by 5	六十四; 64	八十二; 82	进一 advance 1	Cycle repeats		
七 7	下加三 below add 3	下加六 below add 6	四十二; 42	五十五; 55	七十一; 71	八十四; 84	进一 advance 1	Cycle repeats	
八 8	下加二 below add 2	下加四 below add 4	下加六 below add 6	添作五 replace by 5	六十二; 62	七十四; 74	八十六; 86	进一 advance 1	Cycle repeats
九 9	下加一 below add 1	下加二 below add 2	下加三 below add 3	下加四 below add 4	下加五 below add 5	下加六 below add 6	下加七 below add 7	下加八 below add 8	进一 advance 1

The two most extreme beads, the bottommost earth bead and the topmost heaven bead, are usually not used in addition and subtraction. They are essential (compulsory) in some of the multiplication methods (two of three methods require them) and division method (special division table, Qiuchu 九歸, one amongst three methods). When the intermediate result (in multiplication and division) is larger than 15 (fifteen), the second (extra) upper bead is moved halfway to represent ten (xuanchu, suspended). Thus the same rod can represent up to 20 (compulsory as intermediate steps in traditional suanpan multiplication and division).

Animation of traditional division (帰除法) on a 5+2 abacus

The mnemonics/readings of the Chinese division method [Qiuchu] has its origin in the use of bamboo sticks [Chousuan], which is one of the reasons that many believe the evolution of suanpan is independent of the Roman abacus.

This Chinese division method (i.e. with division table) was not in use when the Japanese changed their abacus to one upper bead and four lower beads in about the 1920s.

== Decimal system ==
This 4+1 abacus works as a bi-quinary based number system (the 5+2 abacus is similar but not identical to bi-quinary) in which carries and shifting are similar to the decimal number system. Since each rod represents a digit in a decimal number, the computation capacity of the suanpan is only limited by the number of rods on the suanpan. When a mathematician runs out of rods, another suanpan can be added to the left of the first. In theory, the suanpan can be expanded indefinitely in this way.

The suanpan's extra beads can be used for representing decimal numbers, adding or subtracting decimal numbers, caching carry operations, and base sixteen (hexadecimal) fractions.

== Zhusuan ==
Chinese Zhusuan—— Knowledge and practices of mathematical calculation through the abacus
- UNESCO Intangible Cultural Heritage
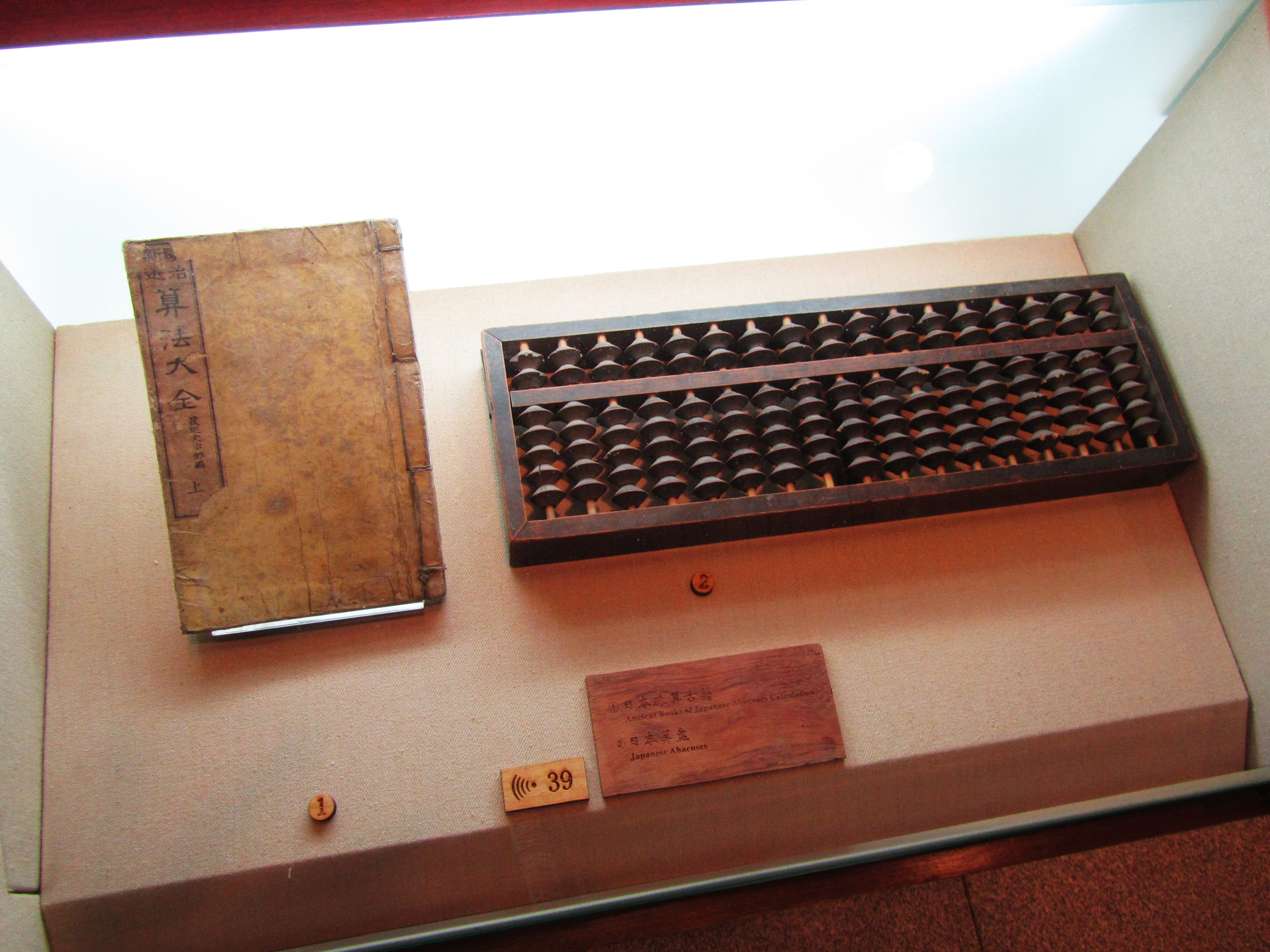
- Country: China
- Reference: 853
- Region: Asia and the Pacific

Inscription history
- Inscription: 2013 (8th session)
- List: Representative
- UNESCO Cultural Heritage

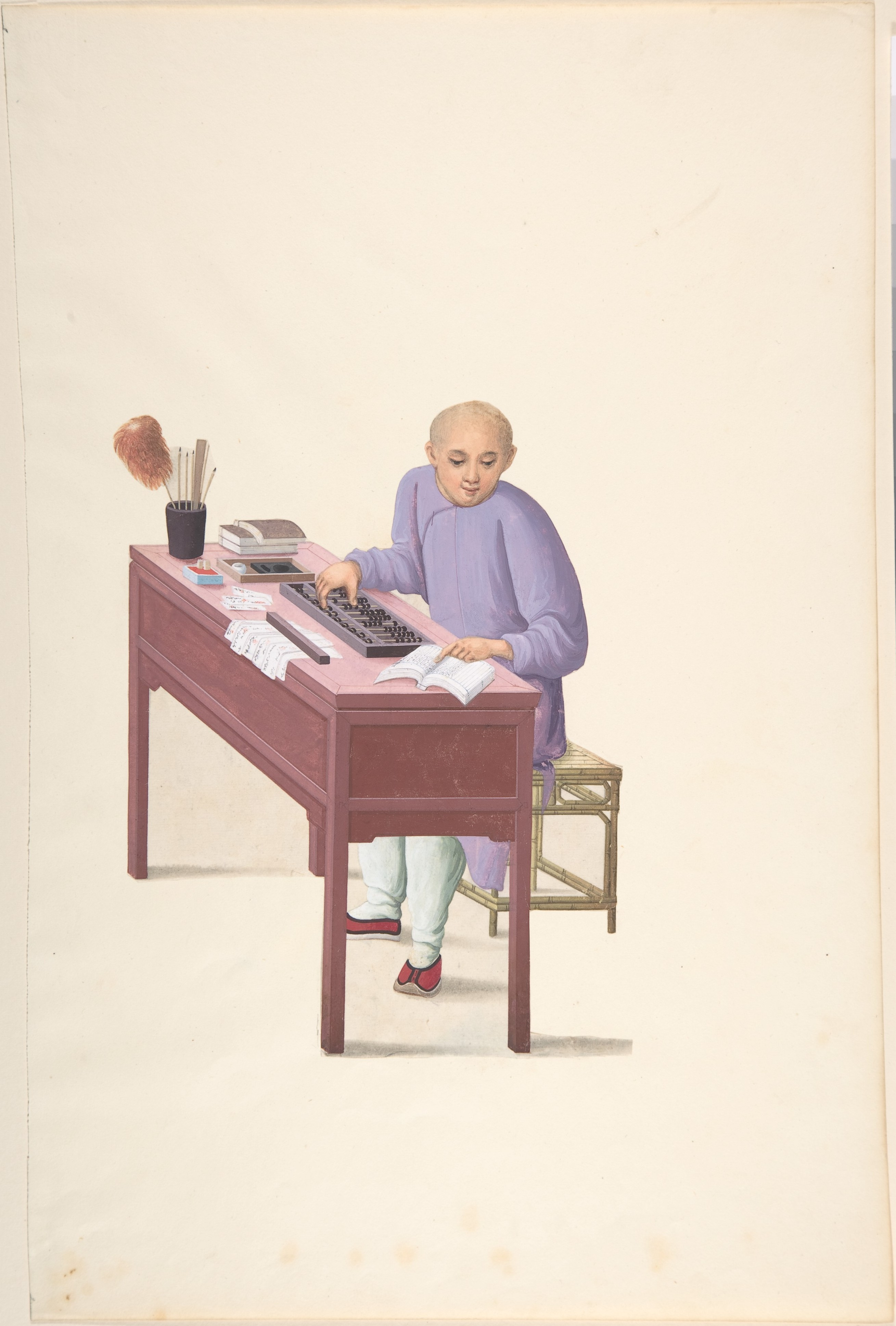
19th-century illustration of a Chinese man with zhusuan

Zhusuan (Chinese: 珠算; literally: "bead calculation") is the knowledge and practices of arithmetic calculation through the suanpan. In the year 2013, it has been inscribed on the UNESCO Representative List of the Intangible Cultural Heritage of Humanity. Zhusuan is named after the Chinese name of abacus, which has been recognised as one of the Fifth Great Innovation in China While deciding on the inscription, the Intergovernmental Committee noted that "Zhusuan is considered by Chinese people as a cultural symbol of their identity as well as a practical tool; transmitted from generation to generation, it is a calculating technique adapted to multiple aspects of daily life, serving multiform socio-cultural functions and offering the world an alternative knowledge system." The movement to get Chinese Zhusuan inscribed in the list was spearheaded by Chinese Abacus and Mental Arithmetic Association.

Zhusuan is an important part of the traditional Chinese culture. Zhusuan has a far-reaching effect on various fields of Chinese society, like Chinese folk custom, language, literature, sculpture, architecture, etc., creating a Zhusuan-related cultural phenomenon. For example, ‘Iron Abacus’ (鐵算盤) refers to someone good at calculating; ‘Plus three equals plus five and minus two’ (三下五除二; +3 = +5 − 2) means quick and decisive; ‘3 times 7 equals 21’ indicates quick and rash; and in some places of China, there is a custom of telling children's fortune by placing various daily necessities before them on their first birthday and letting them choose one to predict their future lives. Among the items is an abacus, which symbolizes wisdom and wealth.

== Modern usage ==
Suanpan arithmetic was still being taught in school in Hong Kong as recently as the late 1960s, and in China into the 1990s. In some less-developed industry, the suanpan (abacus) is still in use as a primary counting device and back-up calculating method. However, when handheld calculators became readily available, school children's willingness to learn the use of the suanpan decreased dramatically. In the early days of handheld calculators, news of suanpan operators beating electronic calculators in arithmetic competitions in both speed and accuracy often appeared in the media. Early electronic calculators could only handle 8 to 10 significant digits, whereas suanpans can be built to virtually limitless precision. But when the functionality of calculators improved beyond simple arithmetic operations, most people realized that the suanpan could never compute higher functions – such as those in trigonometry – faster than a calculator. As digitalised calculators seemed to be more efficient and user-friendly, their functional capacities attract more technological-related and large scale industries in application. Nowadays, even though calculators have become more affordable and convenient, suanpans are still commonly used in China. Many parents still tend to send their children to private tutors or school- and government-sponsored after school activities to learn bead arithmetic as a learning aid and a stepping stone to faster and more accurate mental arithmetic, or as a matter of cultural preservation. Speed competitions are still held.

Suanpans are still widely used elsewhere in China and Japan, as well as in a few places in Canada and the United States. With its historical value, it has symbolized the traditional cultural identity. It contributes to the advancement of calculating techniques and intellectual development, which closely relate to the cultural-related industry like architecture and folk customs. With their operational simplicity and traditional habit, Suanpans are still generally in use in small-scale shops.

In mainland China, formerly accountants and financial personnel had to pass certain graded examinations in bead arithmetic before they were qualified. Starting from about 2002 or 2004, this requirement has been entirely replaced by computer accounting.

== See also ==
- Abacus
- Counting rods
- Soroban
