= Shuli jingyun =

Mathematical encyclopedia

The Shuli jingyun (數理精蘊), known in English as the Collected Essential Principles of Mathematics, is a 53-volume mathematical encyclopedia, part of the Siku Quanshu collection, on musical tuning, calculation, and the calendar. It includes three treatises on astronomy, mathematics, and music, compiled under imperial order during the Kangxi reign. The book was completed in 1723.

Scanned pages of the Shuli jingyun

== Production and distribution ==
The encyclopedia was commissioned by the Kangxi Emperor in 1713 and involved over one hundred scholars studying under the Emperor and Jesuit experts. The compilation of this book was supervised by Prince Yūnlu, with He Guozong (d. 1767) and Mei Gucheng (1681-1746) as main compilers. Compilation of the book began in 1713 and was finished by 1723. In 1724, the first copy was published by the imperial printing shop. The encyclopedia was intended to be used as an imperial textbook in China. Upon its publication, it has been imported to different countries such as Korea in 1729.

The Shuli jingyun is included in the Siku Quanshu collection, commissioned by the Qianlong Emperor. This collection, compiled between 1773 and 1782, includes 3,461 titles and is divided into four treasuries.

== Contents ==
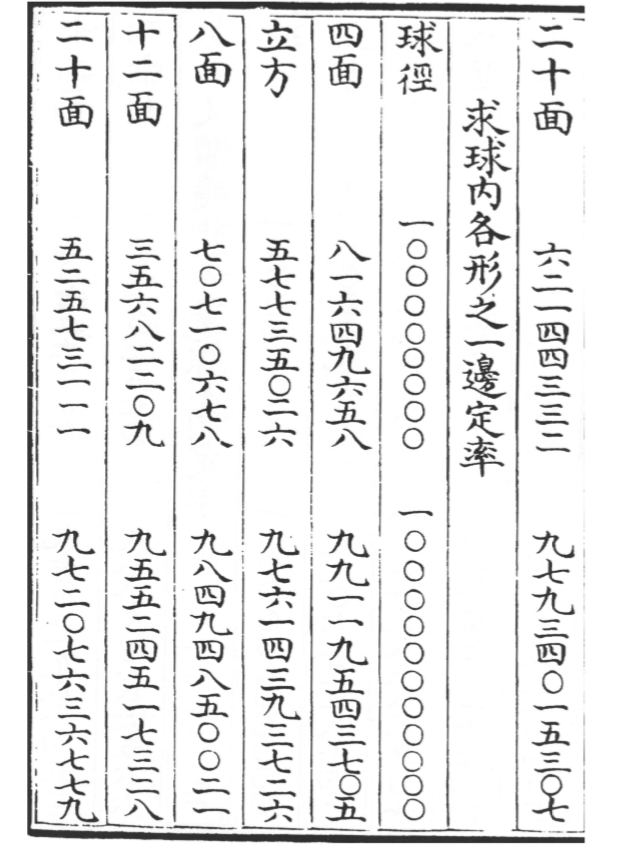
A table of logarithms from the Shuli jingyun

The Shuli jingyun has two parts and an appendix with tables in 8 juan. The first part covers the theory and foundations of Chinese mathematics, while the second part includes five chapters on different mathematical concepts like lines, areas, and volumes.

=== Tables ===
The Shuli jingyun consists of eight volumes (juan) of tables. The first two volumes contain trigonometric function tables calculated every 10 seconds of the quadrant (540 pages). The next two include prime number factors up to 100,000 (702 pages). The next two provide logarithms for numbers up to 100,000 (1,000 pages). The last two offer logarithms of trigonometric functions every 10 seconds of the quadrant (540 pages).

The tables of logarithms were derived from the Arithmetica logarithmica and Trigonometria artificialis, both works by Adriaan Vlacq.
