= List of scientists in the medieval Islamic world =

Islamic scientific achievements encompassed a wide range of subject areas, especially medicine, mathematics, astronomy, agriculture as well as physics, economics, engineering and optics.

Muslim scientists who have contributed significantly to science and civilization in the Islamic Golden Age (i.e. from the 8th century to the 14th century) include:

== Astronomers ==
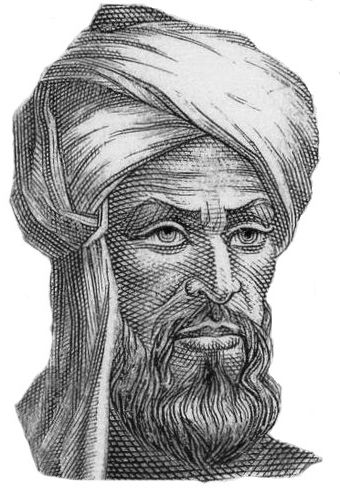
Al-Khwarizmi

- Muhammad al-Fazari (746-796/806)
- Al-Khwarizmi (780-850)
- Sanad ibn Ali (d. 864)
- Al-Marwazi (d. 869)
- Abu Ma'shar al-Balkhi (787-886)
- Al-Farghani (800-870)
- Al-Mahani (d. 880)
- Dīnawarī (d. 895)
- Banū Mūsā (d. 9th century)
- Abu Sa'id Gorgani (d. 9th century)
- Ahmad Nahavandi (d. 9th century)
- Al-Battani (858-929)
- Al-Nayrizi (865-922)
- Abū Ja'far al-Khāzin (900-971)
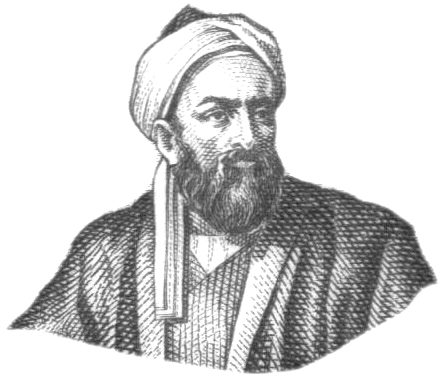
  Al-Biruni
- Abd Al-Rahman Al Sufi (903-986)
- Al-Saghani (d. 990)
- Abū al-Wafā' al-Būzjānī (940-998)
- Abu Al-Fadl Harawi (d. 10th century)
- Abū Sahl al-Qūhī (940-1000)
- Abu-Mahmud al-Khujandi (940-1000)
- Al-Majriti (950-1007)
- Ibn Yunus (950-1009)
- Abu Nasr Mansur (960-1036)
- Kushyar ibn Labban (971-1029)
- Abu l-Hasan 'Ali (d. 1037)
- Ibn al-Haytham (965-1040)
- Al-Bīrūnī (973-1048)
- Ibn Sina (980-1037)
- Ali ibn Ridwan (988-1061)
- Abū Ishāq Ibrāhīm al-Zarqālī (1029-1100)
- Omar Khayyám (1048-1131)
- Ibn Bajjah (1085-1138)
- Ibn Tufail (1105-1185)
- Ibn Rushd (1126-1198)
- Al-Khazini (d. 12th century,fl. 1115-1130)
- Nur ad-Din al-Bitruji (d. 1204)
- Sharaf al-Dīn al-Tūsī (1135-1213)
- Mu'ayyad al-Din al-'Urdi (1200-1266)
- Nasir al-Din Tusi (1201-1274)
- Qutb al-Din al-Shirazi (1236-1311)
- Shams al-Dīn al-Samarqandī (1250-1310)
- Sadr al-Shari'a al-Asghar (d. 1346)
- Ibn al-Shatir (1304-1375)
- Shams al-Dīn Abū Abd Allāh al-Khalīlī (1320-1380)
- Jamshīd al-Kāshī (1380-1429)
- Ulugh Beg (1394-1449)
- Ali Qushji (1403-1474)

== Psychiatrists ==
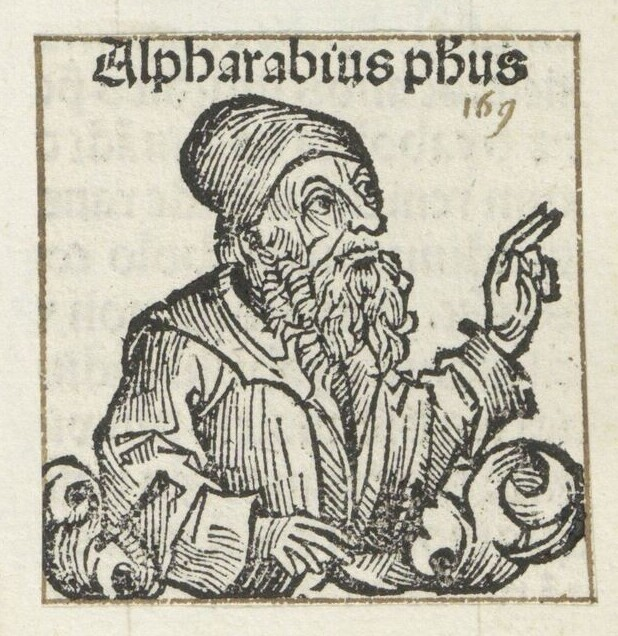
- al-Farabi
  Ibn Sirin (654–728), author of work on dreams and dream interpretation
- Al-Kindi (801–873) (Alkindus), pioneer of psychotherapy and music therapy
- Ali ibn Sahl Rabban al-Tabari (9th century), pioneer of psychiatry, clinical psychiatry and clinical psychology
- Ahmed ibn Sahl al-Balkhi (850–934), pioneer of mental health, medical psychology, cognitive psychology, cognitive therapy, psychophysiology and psychosomatic medicine
- Al-Farabi (872–950) (Alpharabius), pioneer of social psychology and consciousness studies
- Abu al-Qasim al-Zahrawi (936–1013) (Abulcasis), pioneer of neurosurgery
- Ibn al-Haytham (965–1040) (Alhazen), founder of experimental psychology, psychophysics, phenomenology and visual perception
- Al-Biruni (973–1050), pioneer of reaction time
- Avicenna (980–1037) (Ibn Sīnā), pioneer of neuropsychiatry, thought experiment, self-awareness and self-consciousness
- Ibn Zuhr (1094–1162) (Avenzoar), pioneer of neurology and neuropharmacology
- Ibn Tufail (1105–1185), pioneer of tabula rasa and nature versus nurture
- Averroes (1126-1198), pioneer of Parkinson's disease

== Chemists and alchemists ==
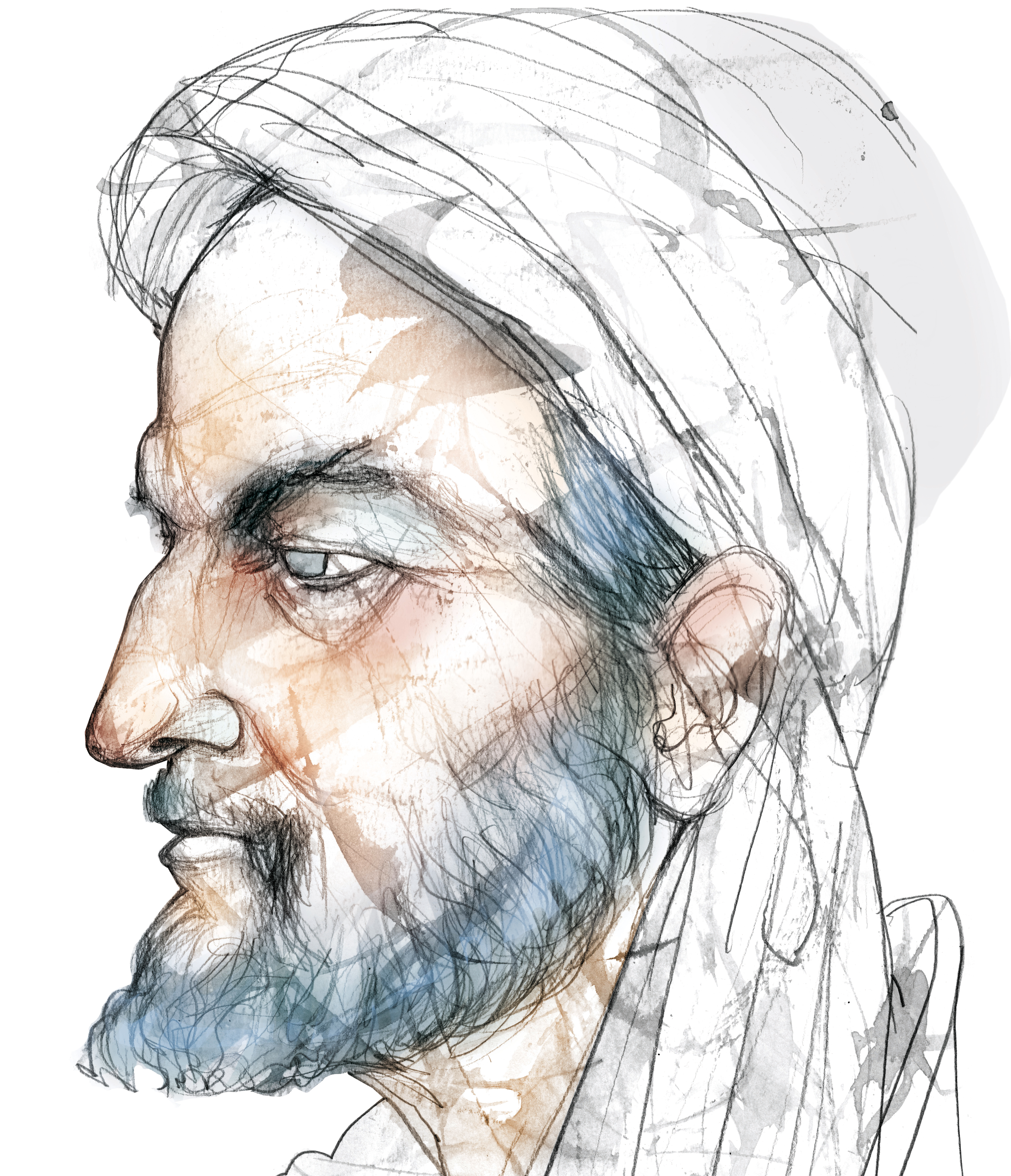
- Abbas ibn Firnas
  Khalid ibn Yazid (668-704) (Calid)
- Jafar al-Sadiq (702–765)
- Jābir ibn Hayyān (721-815) (Geber, not to be confused with pseudo-Geber)
- Al-Khwārizmī (780–850), algebra, mathematics
- Al-Kindi (801–873) (Alkindus)
- Abbas Ibn Firnas (810–887) (Armen Firman)
- Ibn Miskawayh (932–1030)
- Al-Majriti (fl. 1007–1008) (950–1007)
- Abū Rayhān al-Bīrūnī (973–1048)
- Avicenna (980–1037)
- Al-Khazini (fl. 1115–1130)
- Nasir al-Din Tusi (1201–1274)
- Ibn Khaldun (1332–1406)

== Economists and social scientists ==
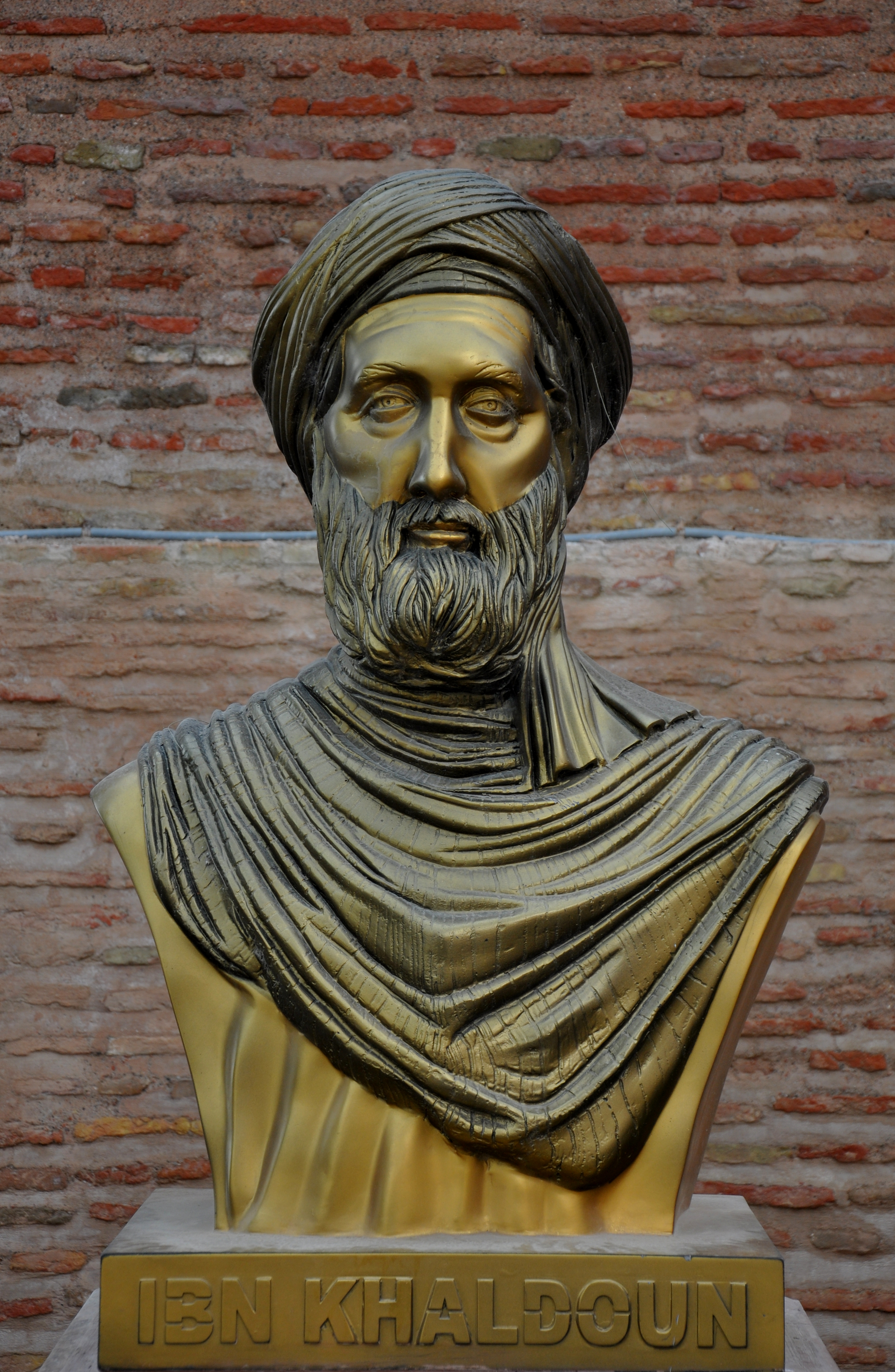
Bust of Ibn Khaldun in the entrance of the Kasbah of Bejaia, Algeria

- Abu Hanifa an-Nu‘man (699–767), Islamic jurisprudence scholar
- Abu Yusuf (729–798), Islamic jurisprudence scholar
- Al-Saghani (d. 990), one of the earliest historians of science
- Ibn Miskawayh (932–1030), economist
- Abū Rayhān al-Bīrūnī (973–1048), Anthropology", Indology
- Ibn Sīnā (Avicenna) (980–1037), economist
- Al-Ghazali (Algazel) (1058–1111), economist
- Al-Mawardi (1075–1158), economist
- Nasīr al-Dīn al-Tūsī (Tusi) (1201–1274), economist
- Ibn al-Nafis (1213–1288), sociologist
- Ibn Khaldun (1332–1406), forerunner of social sciences such as demography, cultural history, historiography, philosophy of history, sociology and economics
- Al-Maqrizi (1364–1442), economist

== Geographers and earth scientists ==
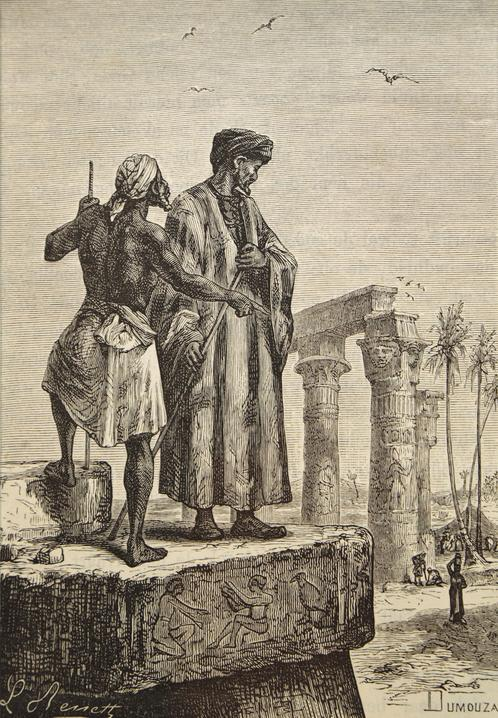
1878 illustration by Léon Benett showing Ibn Battuta (centre) and his guide (left) in Egypt

- Al-Kindi (801-873), pioneer of environmental science
- Ahmad ibn Fadlan (877/879-960)
- Al-Hamdani (893-945/47)
- Ibn Al-Jazzar (895-979)
- Al-Masudi (896-956), the "Herodotus of the Arabs", and pioneer of historical geography
- Al-Tamimi (d. 990)
- Al-Masihi (960-999/1000)
- Abū Rayhān al-Bīrūnī (973-1048), geodesy, geology and Anthropology
- Avicenna (980-1037)
- Ali ibn Ridwan (988-1061)
- Muhammad al-Idrisi (1100-1165), also a cartographer
- Averroes (1126-1198)
- Ibn Jubayr (1145-1217)
- Abd al-Latif al-Baghdadi (1162-1231)
- Zakariya al-Qazwini (1203-1283), geographer, cozmographer, physicist and mathematician. He explained the formation of mountains and collected the latitude, longitude and climate of 700 cities together with their time differences in a book.
- Ibn al-Nafis (1210/11-1288/89)
- Ibn Battuta (1304-1369)
- Ibn Khaldun (1332-1406)
- Piri Reis (1465/70-1553)
- Evliya Çelebi (1611-1684)

== Mathematicians ==
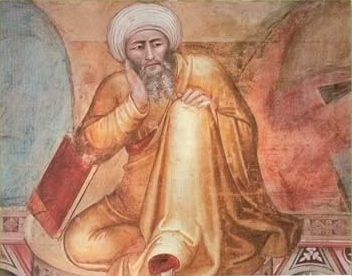
Averroes

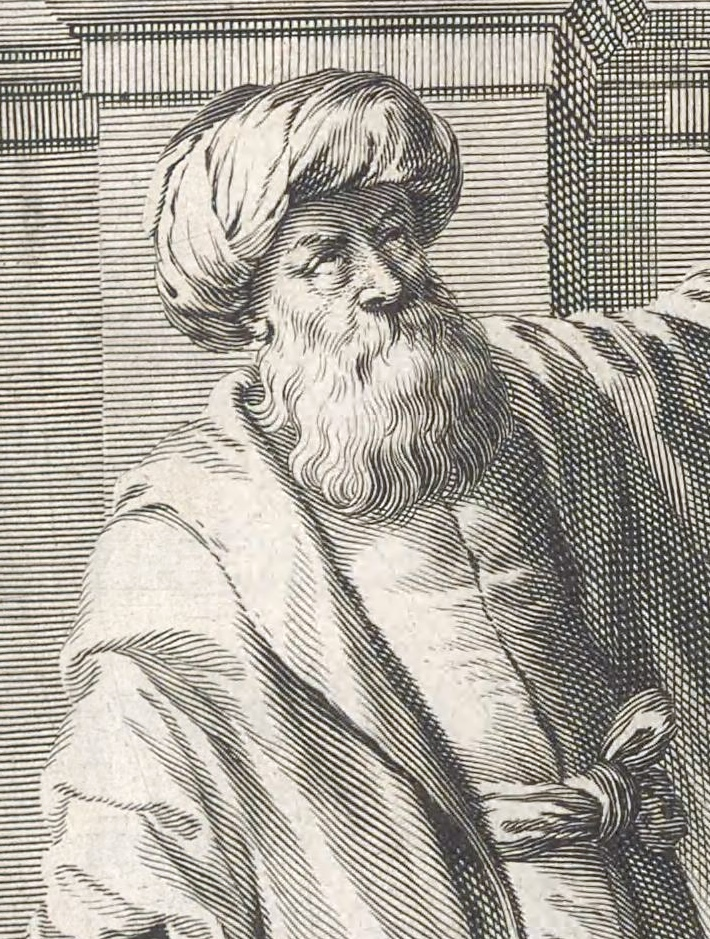
Ibn al-Haytham

- Khalid ibn Yazid (668-704) (Calid)
- Muhammad ibn Mūsā al-Khwārizmī (Algorismi) (780-850), algebra and algorithms
- Al-Hajjāj ibn Yūsuf ibn Matar (786-833)
- Ja'far ibn Muhammad Abu Ma'shar al-Balkhi (Albumasar) (787-886)
- Al-Abbās ibn Said al-Jawharī (800-860)
- Al-Kindi (Alkindus) (801-873)
- Hunayn ibn Ishaq (808-873)
- Ahmed ibn Yusuf (835-912)
- 'Abd al-Hamīd ibn Turk (fi. 830)
- Abū Kāmil Shujā ibn Aslam (850-930)
- Al-Battani (Albatenius) (858-929)
- Al-Nayrizi (865-922)
- Al-Farabi (Abunaser) (870/872-950/951)
- Al-Mahani (d. 880)
- Banū Mūsā (Ben Mousa) (9th century)
  - Ja'far Muhammad ibn Mūsā ibn Shākir
  - Ahmad ibn Mūsā ibn Shākir
  - Al-Hasan ibn Mūsā ibn Shākir
- Abū Ja'far al-Khāzin (900-971)
- Abu-Mahmud al-Khujandi (940-1000)
- Abū al-Wafā' al-Būzjānī (940-998)
- Abū Sahl al-Qūhī (940-1000)
- Ibn Sahl (940-1000)
- Al-Sijzi (945-1020)
- Al-Majriti (950-1007)
- Ibn Yunus (950-1009)
- Abu'l-Hasan al-Uqlidisi (fl. 952)
- Al-Karaji (953-1029)
- Abu Nasr Mansur (960-1036)
- Brethren of Purity (10th century)
- Ibn al-Haytham (Alhacen/Alhazen) (965-1040)
- Kushyar ibn Labban (971-1029)
- Abū Rayhān al-Bīrūnī (973-1048)
- Ibn Seena (Avicenna) (980-1037)
- Ibn Tahir al-Baghdadi (980-1037)
- Al-Jayyani (989-1079)
- Al-Saghani (d.990)
- Al-Nasawi (1011-1075)
- Abū Ishāq Ibrāhīm al-Zarqālī (Arzachel) (1029-1100)
- Omar Khayyám (1048-1131)
- Al-Ghazali (Algazel) (1058-1111)
- Al-Khazini (1077-1130/1155)
- Ibn Bajjah (Avempace) (1085-1138)
- Al-Mu'taman ibn Hud (d. 1085)
- Ibn Rushd (Averroes) (1126-1198)
- Al-Samawal (1130-1180)
- Sharaf al-Dīn al-Tūsī (1135-1213)
- Mo'ayyeduddin Urdi (1200-1266)
- Nasir al-Din al-Tusi (1201-1274), 13th century Persian mathematician and philosopher
- Muḥyi al-Dīn al-Maghribī (1220-1283)
- Qutb al-Din al-Shirazi (1236-1311)
- Shams al-Dīn al-Samarqandī (1250-1310)
- Al-Marrakushi (1256-1321)
- Kamāl al-Dīn al-Fārisī (1265-1318)
- Ibn al-Shatir (1304-1375)
- Qāḍī Zāda al-Rūmī (1364-1436)
- Jamshīd al-Kāshī (1380-1429)
- Ulugh Beg (1394-1449)
- Ali Qushji (1403-1474)
- Abū al-Hasan ibn Alī al-Qalasādī (1412–1482), pioneer of symbolic algebra
- Taqi al-Din Muhammad ibn Ma'ruf (1526-1585)
- Muhammad Baqir Yazdi (d.1637)

== Philosophers ==
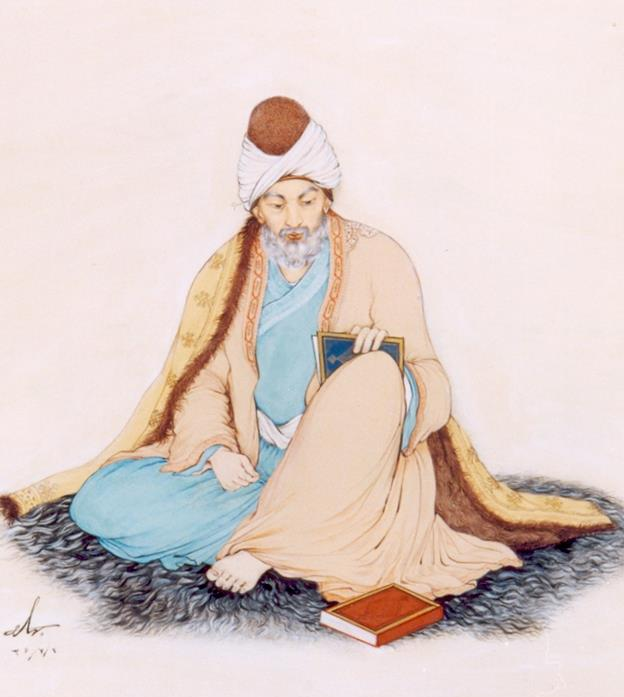
- Rumi
  Al-Kindi (801-873)
- Muhammad ibn Zakariya al-Razi (864/865-925/935)
- Al-Farabi (870/872-950/951)
- Avicenna (980-1037)
- Averroes (1126-1198)
- Ibn Arabi (1165-1240)
- Nasir al-Din al-Tusi (1201-1274)
- Rumi (1207-1273)
- Ibn Khaldun (1332-1406)
- Jami (1414-1492)

== Physicists and engineers ==
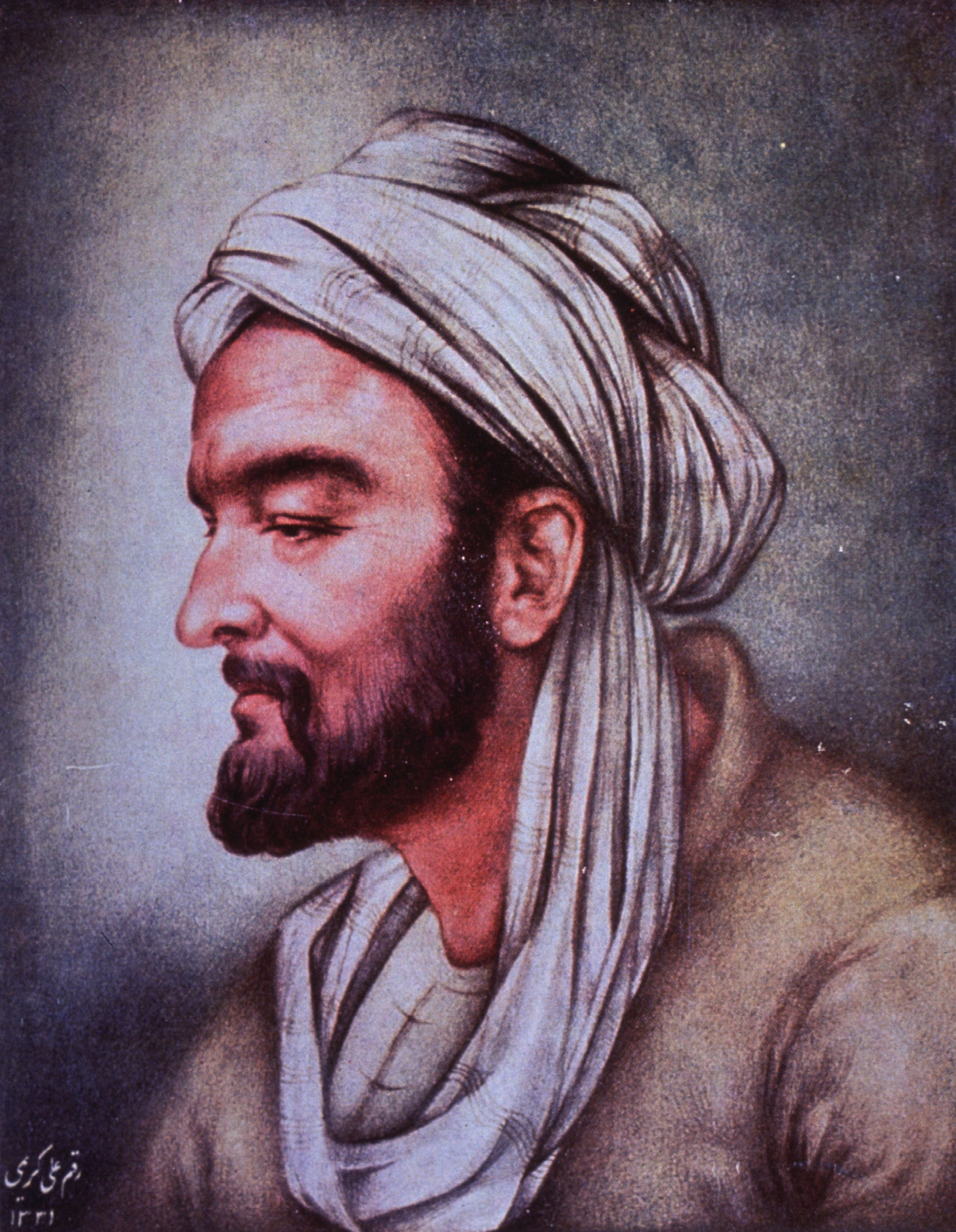
Avicenna

- Abbas Ibn Firnas (810-887)(Armen Firman), 9th century
- Abu Bakr al-Razi (864/865-925/935),9th century
- Banū Mūsā (Ben Mousa), 9th century
  - Ja'far Muhammad ibn Mūsā ibn Shākir
  - Ahmad ibn Mūsā ibn Shākir
  - Al-Hasan ibn Mūsā ibn Shākir
- Abū Sahl al-Qūhī (Kuhi) (940-1000), 10th century
- Ibn Sahl (940-1000), 10th century
- Ibn Yunus (950-1009), 10th century
- Al-Karaji (953-1029), 10th century
- Ibn al-Haytham (Alhacen)(965-1040), 11th century Iraqi scientist, optics, and experimental physics
- Abū Rayhān al-Bīrūnī (973-1048), 11th century, pioneer of experimental mechanics
- Ibn Sīnā/Seena (Avicenna) (980-1037), 11th century
- Al-Saghani (d. 990)
- Al-Khazini (1077-1130/1155), 12th century
- Hibat Allah Abu'l-Barakat al-Baghdaadi (Nathanel) (1080-1164/1165), 12th century
- Ibn Bajjah (Avempace) (1085-1138), 12th century
- Ibn Rushd (Averroes) (1126-1198), 12th century Andalusian mathematician, philosopher and medical expert
- Al-Jazari (1136-1206), 13th century civil engineer
- Nasir al-Din Tusi (1201-1274), 13th century
- Qutb al-Din al-Shirazi (1236-1311), 13th century
- Kamāl al-Dīn al-Fārisī (1265-1318), 13th century
- Ibn al-Shatir (1304-1375), 14th century
- Mimar Sinan (1490–1588), also known as Koca Mi'mâr Sinân Âğâ

== See also ==
- List of pre-modern Arab scientists and scholars
- List of Christian scientists and scholars of the medieval Islamic world
- List of pre-modern Iranian scientists and scholars
