= Principles of Hindu Reckoning =

Middle ages book on arithmetics

division algorithm as described in Principles of Hindu Reckoning $\tfrac{5625}{243}=23\tfrac{36}{243}$

Principles of Hindu Reckoning (Arabic: كتاب في أصول حساب الهند, romanized: Kitab fi usul hisab al-hind) is a mathematics book written by the 10th- and 11th-century Persian mathematician Kushyar ibn Labban. It is the second-oldest book extant in Arabic about Hindu arithmetic using Hindu-Arabic numerals ( ० ۱ ۲ ۳ ۴ ۵ ۶ ۷ ۸ ۹), preceded by Kitab al-Fusul fi al-Hisub al-Hindi (Arabic: كتاب الفصول في الحساب الهندي) by Abul al-Hassan Ahmad ibn Ibrahim al-Uglidis, written in 952.

Although Al-Khwarizmi also wrote a book about Hindu arithmetic in 825, his Arabic original was lost, and only a 12th-century translation is extant. In his opening sentence, Ibn Labban describes his book as one on the principles of Hindu arithmetic. Principles of Hindu Reckoning was one of the foreign sources for Hindu Reckoning in the 10th and 11th century in India. It was translated into English by Martin Levey and Marvin Petruck in 1963 from the only extant Arabic manuscript at that time: Istanbul, Aya Sophya Library, MS 4857 and a Hebrew translation and commentary by Shālôm ben Joseph 'Anābī.

== Indian dust board ==
Hindu arithmetic was conducted on a dust board similar to the Chinese counting board. A dust board is a flat surface with a layer of sand and lined with grids. Very much like the Chinese counting rod numerals, a blank on a sand board grid stood for zero, and zero sign was not necessary. Shifting of digits involves erasing and rewriting, unlike the counting board.

== Content ==
There is only one Arabic copy extant, now kept in the Hagia Sophia Library in Istanbul. There is also a Hebrew translation with commentary, kept in the Bodleian Library of Oxford University. In 1965 University of Wisconsin Press published an English edition of this book translated by Martin Levey and Marvin Petruck, based on both the Arabic and Hebrew editions. This English translation included 31 plates of facsimile of original Arabic text.

Principles of Hindu Reckoning consists of two parts dealing with arithmetics in two numerals system in India at his time.

- Part I mainly dealt with decimal algorithm of subtraction, multiplication, division, extraction of square root and cubic root in place value Hindu-numeral system. However, a section on "halving", was treated differently, i.e., with a hybrid of decimal and sexagesimal numeral.

The similarity between decimal Hindu algorithm with Chinese algorithm in Sunzi Suanjing are striking, except the operation halving, as there was no hybrid decimal/sexagesimal calculation in China.

- Part II dealt with operation of subtraction, multiplication, division, extraction of square root and cubic root in sexagesimal number system. There was only positional decimal arithmetic in China, never any sexagesimal arithmetic.
- Unlike Abu'l-Hasan al-Uqlidisi's Kitab al-Fusul fi al-Hisab al-Hindi (The Arithmetics of Al-Uqlidisi) where the basic mathematical operation of addition, subtraction, multiplication and division were described in words, ibn Labban's book provided actual calculation procedures expressed in Hindu-Arabic numerals.

== Decimal arithmetics ==
=== Addition ===
Rod calculus addition

Hindu addition ala ibn Labban

Kushyar ibn Labban described in detail the addition of two numbers.

The Hindu addition is identical to rod numeral addition in Sunzi Suanjing

operation	Rod calculus	Hindu reckoning
Layout	Arrange two numbers in two rows	Arrange two numbers in two rows
order of calculation	from left to right	from left to right
result	placed on top row	Placed on top row
remove lower row	remove digit by digit from left to right	digit not removed

There was a minor difference in the treatment of second row, in Hindu reckoning, the second row digits drawn on sand board remained in place from beginning to end, while in rod calculus, rods from lower rows were physically removed and add to upper row, digit by digit.

=== Subtraction ===
400AD Sunzi subtraction algorithm

11th-century Hindu subtraction 5625–839

In the 3rd section of his book, Kushyar ibn Labban provided step by step algorithm for subtraction of 839 from 5625. Second row digits remained in place at all time. In rod calculus, digit from second row was removed digit by digit in calculation, leaving only the result in one row.

=== Multiplication ===
Sunzi multiplication

ibn Labban multiplication

Kushyar ibn Labban multiplication is a variation of Sunzi multiplication.

operation	Sunzi	Hindu
multiplicant	placed at upper row,	placed at upper row,
multiplier	third row	2nd row below multiplicant
alignment	last digit of multiplier with first digit of multiplicant	last digit of multiplier with first digit of multiplicant
multiplyier padding	rod numeral blanks	rod numeral style blanks, not Hindu numeral 0
order of calculation	from left to right	from left to right
product	placed at center row	merged with multiplicant
shifting of multiplier	one position to the right	one position to the right

=== Division ===
Professor Lam Lay Yong discovered that the Hindu division method describe by Kushyar ibn Labban is totally identical to rod calculus division in the 5th-century Sunzi Suanjing.

Sunzi division algorithm for $\tfrac{6561}{9}$

Hindu decimal division $\tfrac{5625}{243}$ala ibn Labban

operation	Sunzi division	Hindu division
dividend	on middle row,	on middle row,
divisor	divisor at bottom row	divisor at bottom row
Quotient	placed at top row	placed at top row
divisor padding	rod numeral blanks	rod numeral style blanks, not Hindu numeral 0
order of calculation	from left to right	from left to right
Shifting divisor	one position to the right	one position to the right
Remainder	numerator on middle row,denominator at bottom	numerator on middle row,denominator at bottom

Besides the totally identical format, procedure and remainder fraction, one telltale sign which discloses the origin of this division algorithm is in the missing 0 after 243, which in true Hindu numeral should be written as 2430, not 243blank; blank space is a feature of rod numerals (and abacus).

=== Divide by 2 ===
Divide by 2 or "halving" in Hindu reckoning was treated with a hybrid of decimal and sexagesimal numerals: It was calculated not from left to right as decimal arithmetics, but from right to left: After halving the first digit 5 to get 2 1/2, replace the 5 with 2, and write 30 under it:

5622
30

Final result:

2812
30

=== Extraction of square root ===
Sunzi algorithm for sqrt of 234567=383$\tfrac{311}{968}$

ibn Labban square root of 63342

Kushyar ibn Labban described the algorithm for extraction of square root with example of

$\sqrt(63342)=255\frac{371}{511}$

Kushyar ibn Labban square root extraction algorithm is basically the same as Sunzi algorithm

operation	Sunzi square root	ibn Labban sqrt
dividend	on middle row,	on middle row,
divisor	divisor at bottom row	divisor at bottom row
Quotient	placed at top row	placed at top row
divisor padding	rod numeral blanks	rod numeral style blanks, not Hindu numeral 0
order of calculation	from left to right	from left to right
divisor doubling	multiplied by 2	multiplied by 2
Shifting divisor	one position to the right	one position to the right
Shifting quotient	Positioned at beginning, no subsequent shift	one position to the right
Remainder	numerator on middle row,denominator at bottom	numerator on middle row,denominator at bottom
final denominator	no change	add 1

The approximation of non perfect square root using Sunzi algorithm yields result slightly higher than the true value in decimal part, the square root approximation of Labban gave slightly lower value, the integer part are the same.

== Sexagesimal arithmetics ==
=== Multiplication ===
The Hindu sexagesimal multiplication format was completely different from Hindu decimal arithmetics. Kushyar ibn Labban's example of 25 degree 42 minutes multiplied by 18 degrees 36 minutes was written vertically as

18| |25
36| |42

with a blank space in between

== Influence ==
Kushyar ibn Labban's Principles of Hindu Reckoning exerted strong influence on later Arabic algorists. His student al-Nasawi followed his teacher's method. Algorist of the 13th century, Jordanus de Nemore's work was influenced by al-Nasawi. As late as 16th century, ibn Labban's name was still mentioned.
