= Al-Nasawi =

al-Nasawi is a surname. Notable people with the surname include:

- Ali ibn Ahmad al-Nasawi (c. 1011 – c. 1075), Persian mathematician and astronomer
- Shihab al-Din Muhammad al-Nasawi (died c. 1250), Persian secretary and biographer
