= Mathematical Treatise in Nine Sections =

1247 Chinese text by Qin Jiushao

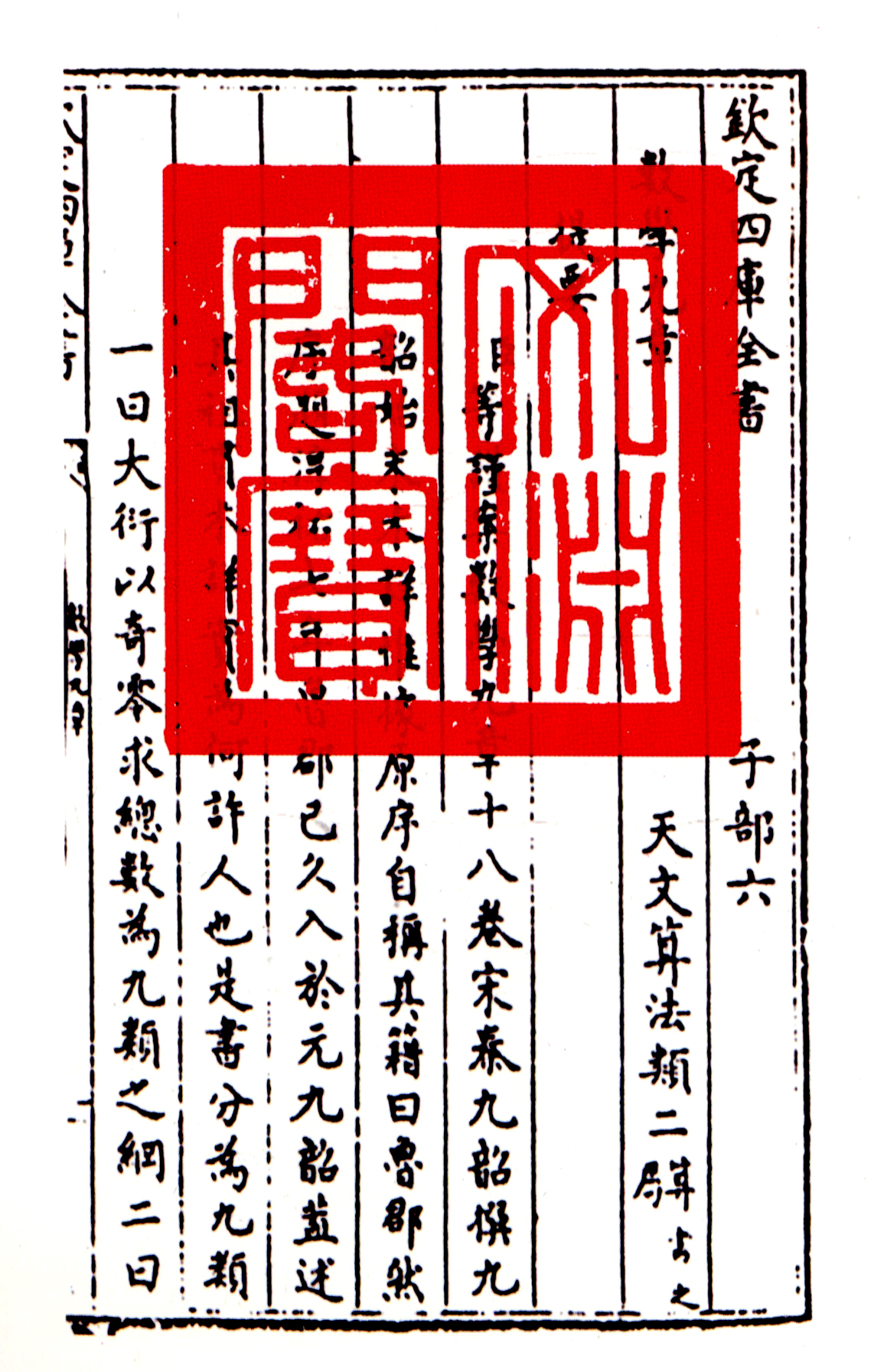
Mathematical Treatise in Nine Sections in the Complete Library of the Four Treasuries

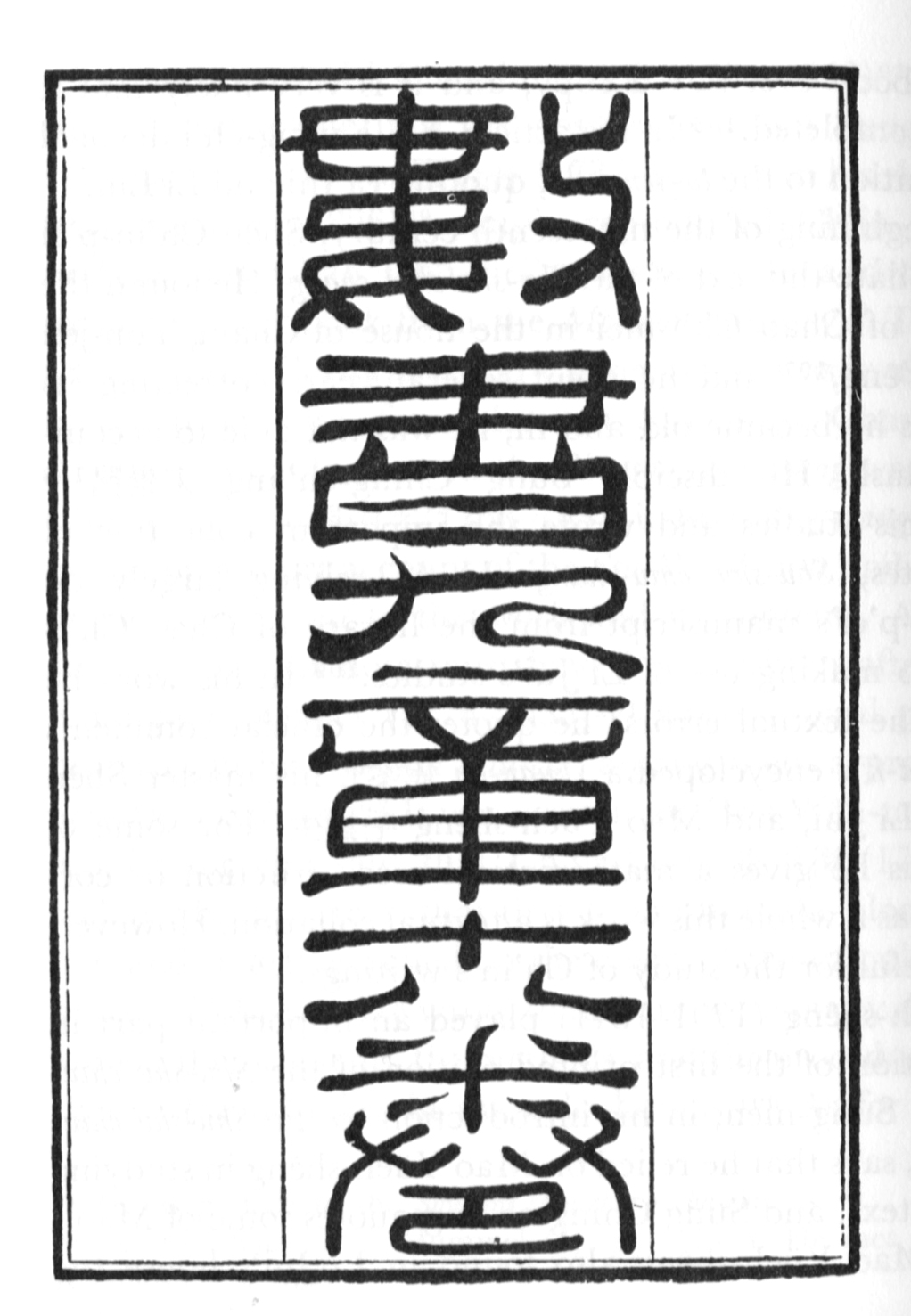
1842 wood block printed Shu Shu Jiu Zhang

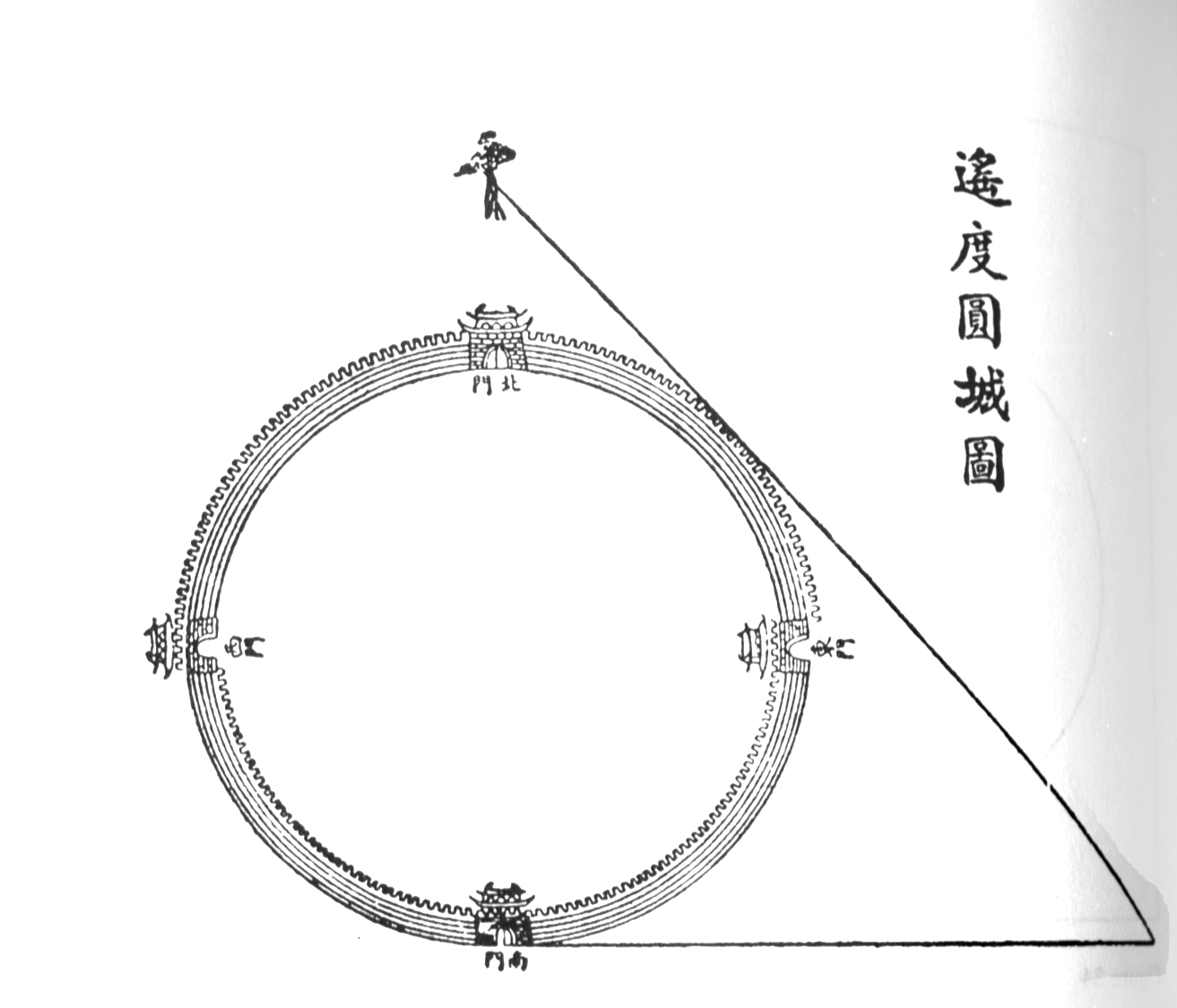
surveying a round city from afar. Shu Shu Jiu Zhang

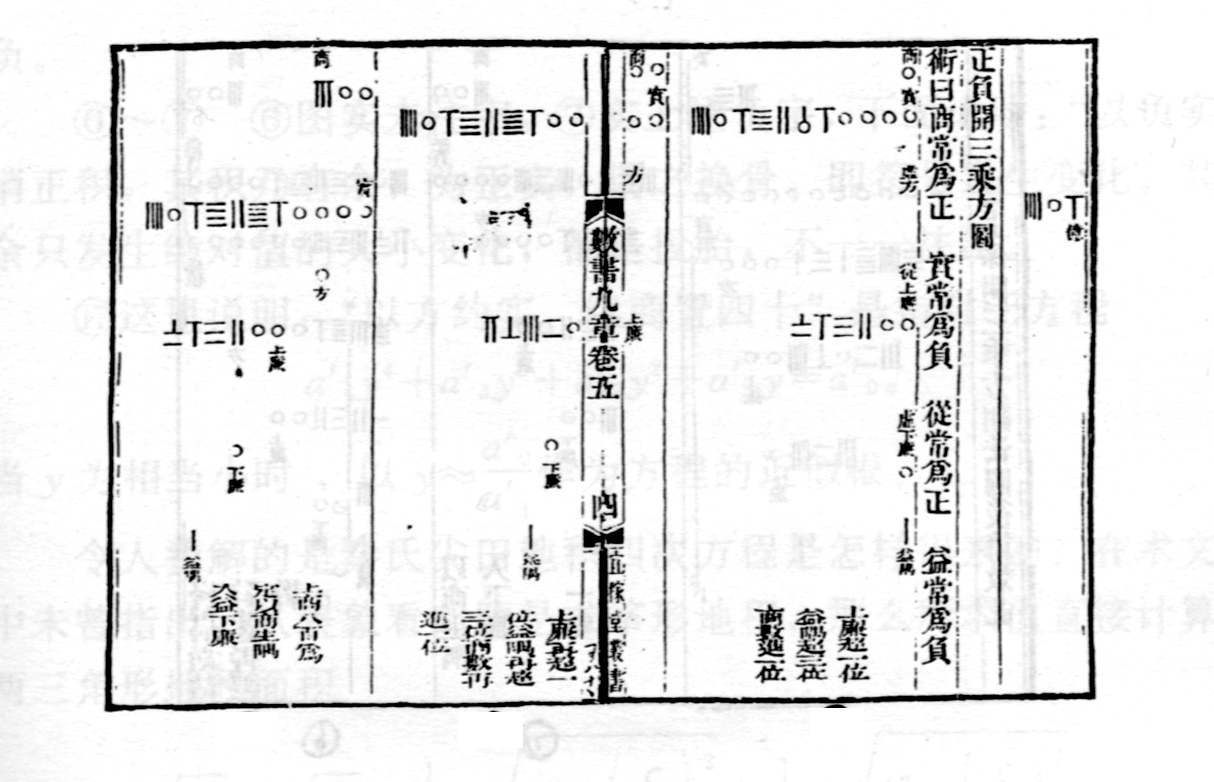
Qin Jiushao solved third order equation with rod calculus

The Mathematical Treatise in Nine Sections (simplified Chinese: 数书九章; traditional Chinese: 數書九章; pinyin: Shùshū Jiǔzhāng; Wade–Giles: Shushu Chiuchang) is a mathematical text written by Chinese Southern Song dynasty mathematician Qin Jiushao in the year 1247. The mathematical text has a wide range of topics and is taken from all aspects of the society of that time, including agriculture, astronomy, water conservancy, urban layout, construction engineering, surveying, taxation, armament, military and so on.

This book contains nine chapters:

1. Da Yan type (Indeterminate equations);
2. Heaven phenomena
3. Area of land and field
4. Surveying
5. Taxation
6. Storage of grains
7. Building construction
8. Military matters
9. Price and interest.

Each chapter contains nine problems, a total of 81 problems. Apart from describing Chinese Remainder Theorem for the first time and providing a constructive proof for it, the text investigated:

- Indeterminate equations
- "Linglong method" (玲瓏開方; línglóng kāifāng, roughly "method of harmoniously alternating evolution") for numerical solution of algebraic equations, 570 years before Horner's method
- Areas and volumes of geometric objects and
- Linear system

Like many traditional Chinese mathematical works, the text reflects a Confucian administrator's concern with more practical mathematical problems, like calendrical, mensural, and fiscal problems.

The text existed in manuscript form in 1247, it was incorporated into The Yongle Encyclopedia in 1421; in 1787 the book was collected into the Complete Library of the Four Treasuries, in 1842 appeared in woodblock printed edition. The 19th century British Protestant Christian missionary Alexander Wylie in his article Jottings on the Sciences of Chinese Mathematics published in North China Herald 1852, was the first person to introduce Mathematical Treatise in Nine Sections to the West. In 1971 Belgian sinologist Ulrich Libbrecht published his doctorate dissertation, Chinese Mathematics in the Thirteenth Century, which earned him a degree cum laude at Leiden University.
