= Chinese multiplication table =

Table of multiplication up to 9 times 9

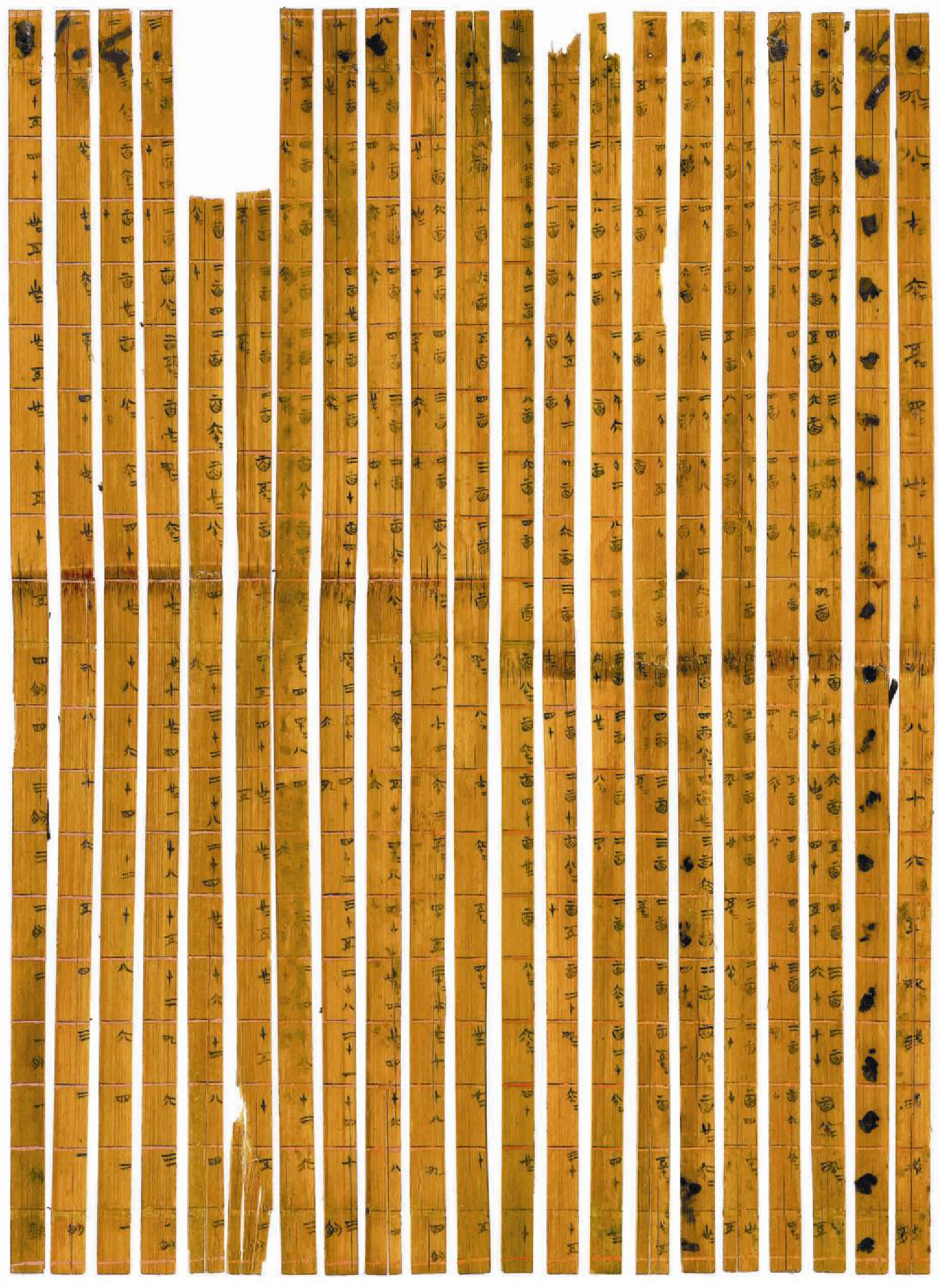
The Tsinghua Bamboo Slips, containing the world's earliest decimal multiplication table, dated 305 BC during the Warring States period

The Chinese multiplication table is the first requisite for using the Rod calculus for carrying out multiplication, division, the extraction of square roots, and the solving of equations based on place value decimal notation. It was known in China as early as the Spring and Autumn period, and survived through the age of the abacus; pupils in elementary school today still must memorise it.

The Chinese multiplication table consists of eighty-one terms. It was often called the nine-nine table, or simply nine-nine, because in ancient times, the nine nine table started with 9 × 9: nine nines beget eighty-one, eight nines beget seventy-two ... seven nines beget sixty three, etc. two ones beget two. In the opinion of Wang Guowei, a noted scholar, the nine-nine table probably started with nine because of the "worship of nine" in ancient China; the emperor was considered the "nine five supremacy" in the Book of Change. See also Numbers in Chinese culture § Nine.

It is also known as nine-nine song (or poem), as the table consists of eighty-one lines with four or five Chinese characters per lines; this thus created a constant metre and render the multiplication table as a poem. For example, 9 × 9 = 81 would be rendered as "九九八十一", or "nine nine eighty one", with the world for "begets" "得" implied. This makes it easy to learn by heart. A shorter version of the table consists of only forty-five sentences, as terms such as "nine eights beget seventy-two" are identical to "eight nines beget seventy-two" so there is no need to learn them twice. When the abacus replaced the counting rods in the Ming dynasty, many authors on the abacus advocated the use of the full table instead of the shorter one. They claimed that memorising it without needing a moment of thinking makes abacus calculation much faster.

The existence of the Chinese multiplication table is evidence of an early positional decimal system: otherwise a much larger multiplication table would be needed with terms beyond 9×9.

== The Nine-nine song text in Chinese ==
It can be read in either row-major or column-major order.

九九乘法口诀表 (The Nine-nine multiplication table)
×	1 一 yī	2 二 èr	3 三 sān	4 四 sì	5 五 wǔ	6 六 liù	7 七 qī	8 八 bā	9 九 jiǔ
1 一 yī	一一得一								
2 二 èr	一二得二	二二得四							
3 三 sān	一三得三	二三得六	三三得九						
4 四 sì	一四得四	二四得八	三四十二	四四十六					
5 五 wǔ	一五得五	二五一十	三五十五	四五二十	五五二十五				
6 六 liù	一六得六	二六十二	三六十八	四六二十四	五六三十	六六三十六			
7 七 qī	一七得七	二七十四	三七二十一	四七二十八	五七三十五	六七四十二	七七四十九		
8 八 bā	一八得八	二八十六	三八二十四	四八三十二	五八四十	六八四十八	七八五十六	八八六十四	
9 九 jiǔ	一九得九	二九十八	三九二十七	四九三十六	五九四十五	六九五十四	七九六十三	八九七十二	九九八十一

Nine-nine multiplication table
×	1 One yī	2 Two èr	3 Three sān	4 Four sì	5 Five wǔ	6 Six liù	7 Seven qī	8 Eight bā	9 Nine jiǔ
1 One yī	One times one equals one								
2 Two èr	One times two equals two	Two times two equals four							
3 Three sān	One times three equals three	Two times three equals six	Three times three equals nine						
4 Four sì	One times four equals four	Two times four equals eight	Three times four equals twelve	Four times four equals sixteen					
5 Five wǔ	One times five equals five	Two times five equals ten	Three times five equals fifteen	Four times five equals twenty	Five times five equals twenty-five				
6 Six liù	One times six equals six	Two times six equals twelve	Three times six equals eighteen	Four times six equals twenty-four	Five times six equals thirty	Six times six equals thirty-six			
7 Seven qī	One times seven equals seven	Two times seven equals fourteen	Three times seven equals twenty-one	Four times seven equals twenty-eight	Five times seven equals thirty-five	Six times seven equals forty-two	Seven times seven equals forty-nine		
8 Eight bā	One times eight equals eight	Two times eight equals sixteen	Three times eight equals twenty-four	Four times eight equals thirty-two	Five times eight equals forty	Six times eight equals forty-eight	Seven times eight equals fifty-six	Eight times eight equals sixty-four	
9 Nine jiǔ	One times nine equals nine	Two times nine equals eighteen	Three times nine equals twenty-seven	Four times nine equals thirty-six	Five times nine equals forty-five	Six times nine equals fifty-four	Seven times nine equals sixty-three	Eight times nine equals seventy-two	Nine times nine equals eighty-one

== The Nine-nine table in Chinese literature ==
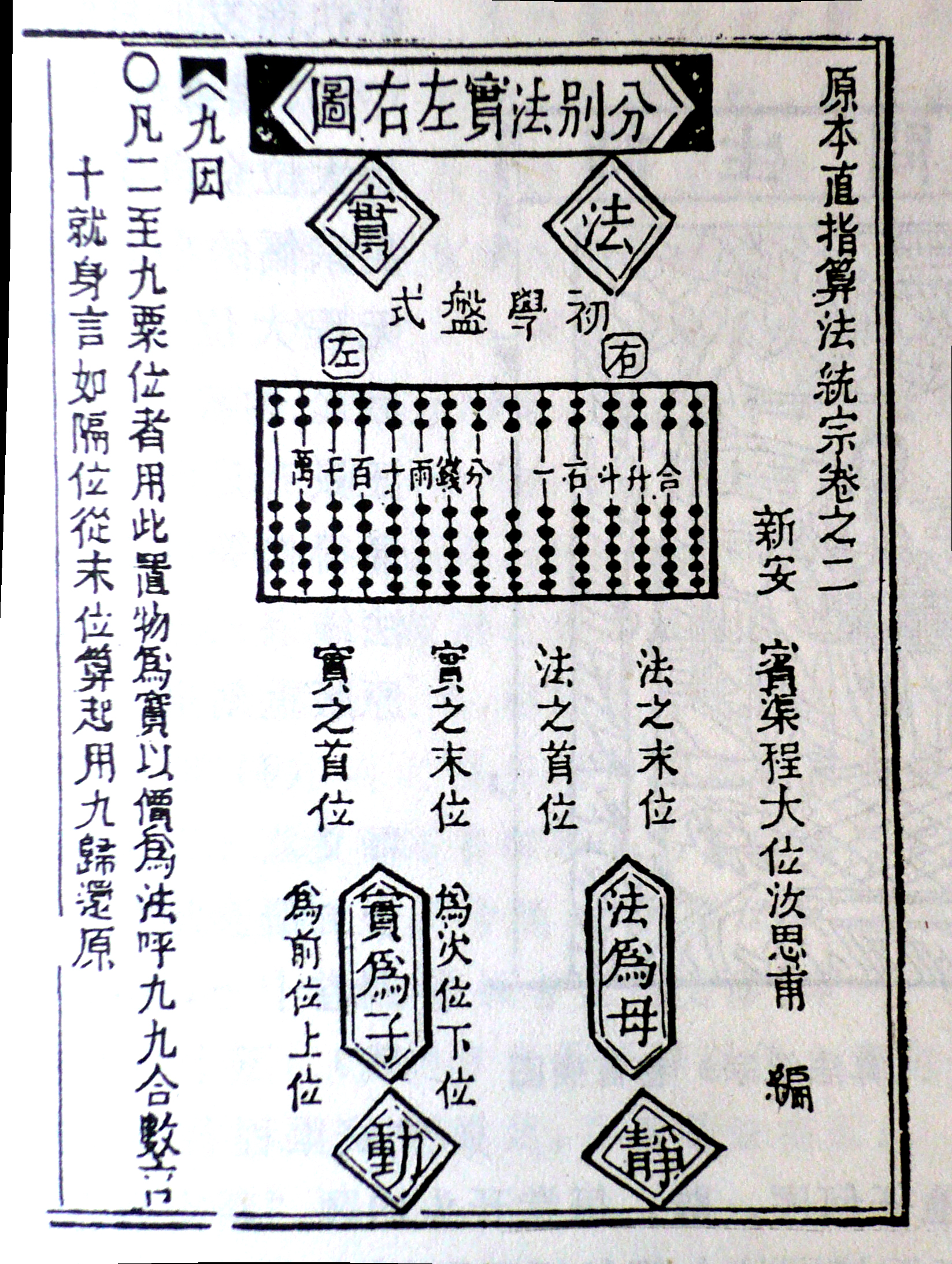
Nine nine song in Ming dynasty Cheng Dawei Suanfa tongzong Volume II

Many Chinese classics make reference to the nine-nine table:

- Zhoubi Suanjing: "nine nine eighty one"
- Guan Zi has sentences of the form "three eights beget twenty four, three sevens beget twenty-one"
- The Nine Chapters on the Mathematical Art: "Fu Xi invented the art of nine-nine".
- In Huainanzi, there were eight sentences: "nine nines beget eighty one", "eight nines beget seventy two", all the way to "two nines beget eighteen".
- A nine-nine table manuscript was discovered in Dun Huang.
- Xia Houyang's Computational Canons: "To learn the art of multiplication and division, one must understand nine-nine".
- The Song dynasty author Hong Zhai's Notebooks said: "three threes as nine, three fours as twelve, two eights as sixteen, four fours as sixteen, three nines as twenty seven, four nines as thirty six, six sixes as thirty six, five eights as forty, five nines as forty five, seven nines as sixty three, eight nines as seventy two, nine nines as eighty one". This suggests that the table has begun with the smallest term since the Song dynasty.
- Song dynasty mathematician Yang Hui's mathematics text book: Suan fa tong bian ben mo, meaning "You must learn nine nine song from one one equals one to nine nine eighty one, in small to large order"
- Yuan dynasty mathematician Zhu Shijie's Suanxue qimeng (Elementary mathematics): "one one equals one, two by two equals four, one by three equals three, two by three equals six, three by three equals nine, one by four equals four... nine by nine equals eight one"

== Archeological artifacts ==
- At the end of the 19th century, archeologists unearthed pieces of written bamboo script from the Han dynasty in Xin Jiang. One such Han dynasty bamboo script, from Liusha, is a remnant of the nine-nine table. It starts with nine: nine nine eighty one, eight nine seventy two, seven nine sixty three, eight eight sixty four, seven eight fifty six, six eight forty eight, ... two two gets four, altogether 1100 Chinese words.
- In 2002, Chinese archeologists unearthed a written wood script from a two-thousand-year-old site from the Warring States, on which was written: "four eight thirty two, five eight forty, six eight forty eight." This is the earliest artifact of the nine-nine table that has been unearthed, indicating that the nine-nine table, as well as a positional decimal system, had appeared by the Warring States period.
- Tsinghua Bamboo Slips Calculation Table, is an ancient calculator artifact from the Warring States period in 305 BC. It is included in the "Tsinghua University Collection of Warring States Bamboo Slips (Part IV)," predating the previously discovered Liye Qin Bamboo Slips and Zhangjiashan Han Bamboo Slips nine-nine tables by a century.
- In 2023, a bamboo slip from the 4th century BC, containing a multiplication formula, was found in a Jingzhou tomb in Hubei Province, China. The formula was deciphered using infrared scanning, revealing calculations such as "five times seven is thirty plus five, four times seven is twenty plus eight, three times seven is twenty plus one." As of December 2023, this represents the earliest discovery of a nine-nine table artifact.
- The nine-nine table was transmitted to Japan, and appeared in a Japanese primary mathematics book in the 10th century, beginning with 9×9.
