= Kushyar ibn Labban =

Persian mathematician, geographer, and astronomer (971–1029)

- كوشيار بن لبان
- Born: 971; Gilan, Justanid dinasty
- Died: 1029; Baghdad, Buyid Empire

Academic work
- Era: Islamic Golden Age
- Main interests: Astronomy, mathematics, geography

Abu l-Hasan Kūshyār ibn Labbān ibn Bashahrī al-Jīlī (Arabic: أبو الحسن كوشياربن لبّان بن باشهري الجيلي) (971–1029), also known as Kushyar ibn Labban, was an Iranian mathematician, geographer, and astronomer from Gilan, south of the Caspian Sea, Iran. Author of Principles of Hindu Reckoning.

== Career ==
Kūshyār ibn Labban's main work was probably done about the beginning of the 11th century, and seems to have taken an important part in the elaboration of trigonometry. He continued the investigations of the 10th century mathematician and astronomer Abul Wáfa, and devoted much space to this in his zīj (book of astronomical tables) az-Zīj al-Jamī wal-Baligh ("The Comprehensive and Mature Tables"), which incorporated the improved values of the planetary apogees observed by al-Battani. The tables were translated into the Persian language before the end of the century. He wrote also an astrological introduction and an arithmetic treatise Principles of Hindu Reckoning (Kitab fi usul hisab al-hind), that is extant in both Arabic and Hebrew), and was translated to English in 1963.

Kūshyār Daylami's pupils included the Persian mathematician Ali ibn Ahmad al-Nasawi. Kūshyār ibn Labban is thought to have died in Baghdad.

== Works ==
All of Kushyar’s surviving works were composed in Arabic. The popularity of his astrological handbook is evident from its transmission in Persian, Turkish, and Chinese manuscripts.

- Kitāb fī Uṣūl ḥisāb al-Hind (Book on the Principles of Hindu Reckoning).
- Kitāb al-Asṭurlāb (Book on the Astrolabe).
- al-Madkhal fī ṣināʿat aḥkām al-nujūm, also: Mujmal al-uṣūl fī aḥkām al-nujūm (Introduction to the Art of Astrology / Summary of the Principles of Astrology).
- al-Zīj al-Jāmiʿ (The Comprehensive Astronomical Tables/Zīj).
- al-Zīj al-Bāligh (The Extensive/Mature Astronomical Tables) of which only one chapter survives.
