= Saghani =

Persian astronomer and historian of science

Ṣāghānī
- ابوحامد صاغانی
- Died: 990; Baghdad

Academic work
- Era: Islamic Golden Age
- Main interests: Astronomy, History of science

Abu Hamid Ahmed ibn Mohammed al-Saghani al-Asturlabi (Persian: ابوحامد صاغانی, referred to by at least one source as Ṣāghānī, was a Persian astronomer and historian of science. His name means "the astrolabe maker of Saghan, near Merv". He flourished in Baghdad, where he died in 990.

== Works ==
Al-Asturlabi wrote some of the earliest comments on the history of science. These included the following comparison between the "ancients" (including the ancient Babylonians, Egyptians, Greeks and Indians) and the "modern scholars" (the Muslim scientists of his time):

"The ancients distinguished themselves through their chance discovery of basic principles and the invention of ideas. The modern scholars, on the other hand, distinguish themselves through the invention of a multitude of scientific details, the simplification of difficult (problems), the combination of scattered (information), and the explanation of (material which already exists in) coherent (form). The ancients came to their particular achievements by virtue of their priority in time, and not on account of any natural qualification and intelligence. Yet, how many things escaped them which then became the original inventions of modern scholars, and how much did the former leave for the latter to do."

— Rosenthal, 1950

== Sources ==
- Puig, Roser (2007). "Ṣāghānī: Abū Ḥāmid Aḥmad ibn Muḥammad al‐Ṣāghānī [al‐Ṣaghānī] al‐Asṭurlābī". In Thomas Hockey; et al. (eds.). The Biographical Encyclopedia of Astronomers. New York: Springer. p. 1004. ISBN 978-0-387-31022-0. (PDF version)
- Rosenthal, Franz (1950). "Al-Asturlabi and as-Samaw'al on Scientific Progress". Osiris. 9: 555–564. doi:10.1086/368538. S2CID 224796639.
