= Abu'l-Hasan al-Uqlidisi =

10th century Islamic-world mathematician

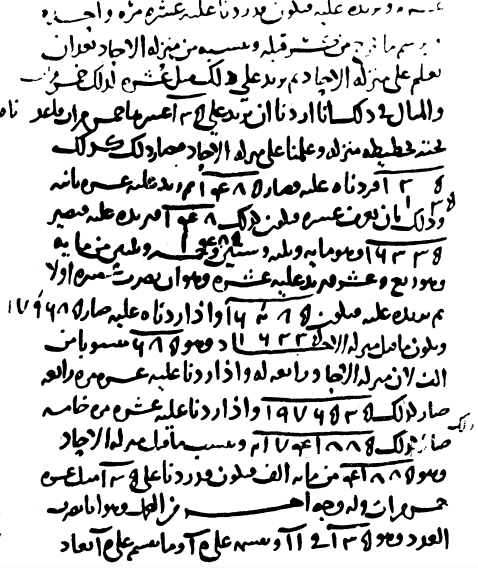
A page from Kitāb al-Fuṣūl, containing the first known use of decimal fractions. Two such fractions occur in line 10, with a vertical line appearing above the digits ٣ and ٩ to indicate the unit's place before the fractional part.

Abū al-Ḥassan, Aḥmad Ibn Ibrāhīm, al-Uqlīdisī (Arabic: أبو الحسن أحمد بن ابراهيم الإقليدسي, fl. 952) was a Muslim Arab mathematician of the Islamic Golden Age, possibly from Damascus, who wrote the earliest surviving book on the use of decimal fractions with Hindu–Arabic numerals, Kitāb al-Fuṣūl fī al-Ḥisāb al-Hindī (The Book of Chapters on Hindu Arithmetic), in Arabic in 952. The book is well preserved in a single 12th-century manuscript, but other than the author's name, original year of publication (341 AH, 952/3 AD) and the place (Damascus) we know nothing else about the author: after an extensive survey of extant reference material, mathematical historian Ahmad Salīm Saʿīdān, who discovered the manuscript in 1960, could find no other mention of him. His nickname al-Uqlīdisī ("the Euclidean") was commonly given to people who sold manuscript copies of Euclid's Elements.

In the introductory remarks to his Arithmetic, Al-Uqlīdisī claims that he traveled to confer with every arithmetic expert he knew of, and read every previous book he could find, and comprehensively synthesized this previous work while adding his own ideas. The Arithmetic describes the main calculation methods of medieval Islamic arithmetic, including finger reckoning, the Greco-Babylonian sexagesimal system commonly used for astronomy, calculations with fractions, and positional decimal calculations using the Hindu–Arabic system performed using the dust board and stylus. It is especially notable for its treatment of decimal fractions, and for showing how to calculate using pen and paper rather than an erasable dust board.

While the Persian mathematician Jamshīd al-Kāshī claimed to have discovered decimal fractions himself in the 15th century, J. Lennart Berggren notes that he was mistaken, as decimal fractions were first used five centuries before him by al-Uqlidisi as early as the 10th century.

A. S. Saidan who studied al-Uqlidisi's mathematical treatise in detail wrote:

The most remarkable idea in this work is that of decimal fraction. Al-Uqlidisi uses decimal fractions as such, appreciates the importance of a decimal sign, and suggests a good one. Not al-Kashi (d. 1436/7) who treated decimal fractions in his "Miftah al-Hisab", but al-Uqlidisi, who lived five centuries earlier, is the first Muslim mathematician so far known to write about decimal fractions.

— Saidan (1966)

== See also ==
- Principles of Hindu Reckoning
