= Barnaba Tortolini =

Italian priest and mathematician (1808–1874)

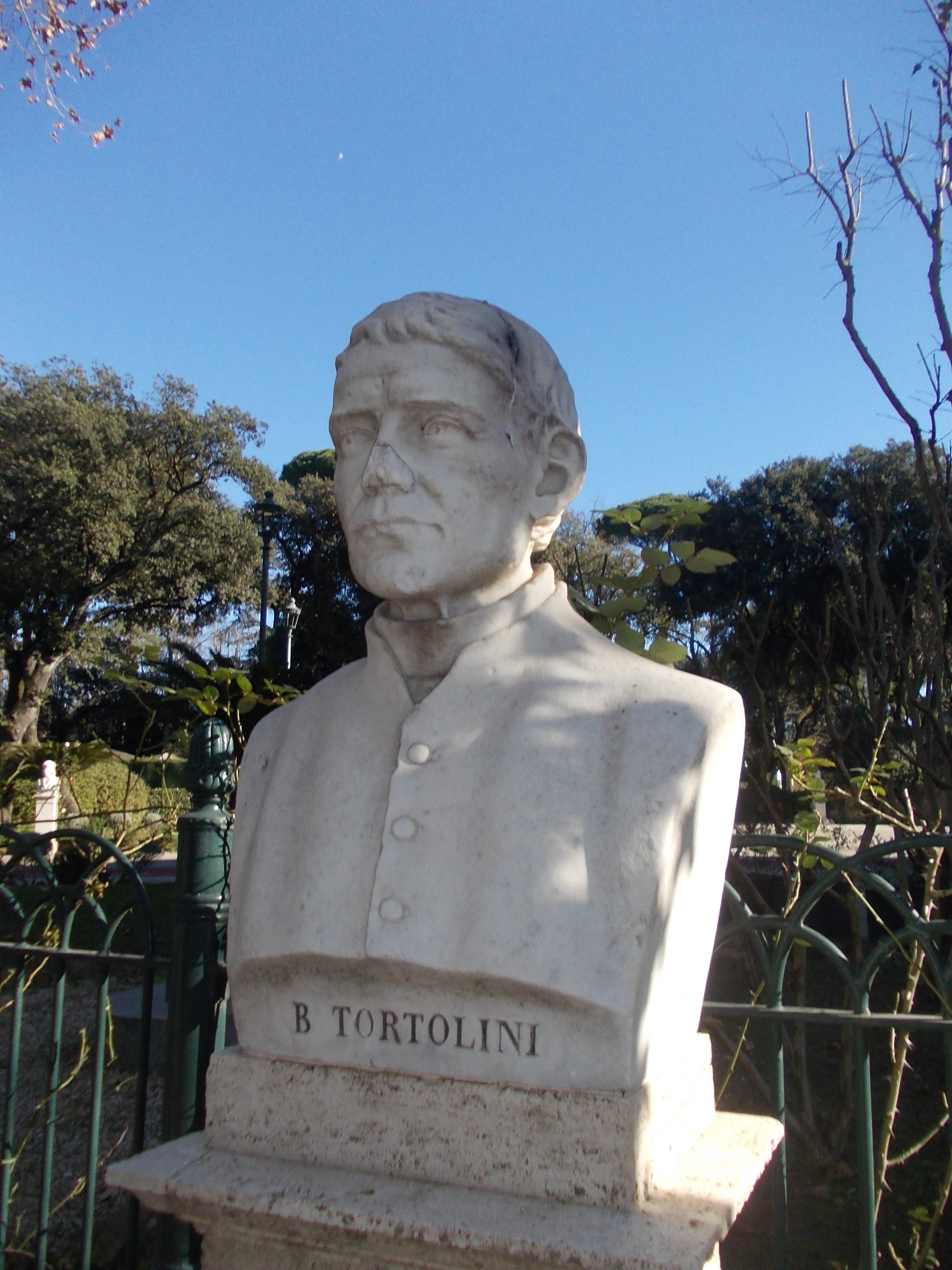
- Marble bust at Pincio, Rome
- Born: November 19, 1808; Rome
- Died: August 24, 1874 (aged 65); Ariccia, Rome
- Citizenship: Italian
- Education: Pontifical Gregorian University
- Known for: Annali di scienze matematiche e fisiche
- Scientific career
- Fields: mathematics
- Workplaces: Collegio Urbano de Propaganda Fide; Pontifical Gregorian University; University of Rome

Barnaba Tortolini (19 November 1808 – 24 August 1874) was a 19th-century Italian priest and mathematician who played an early active role in advancing the scientific unification of the Italian states. He founded the first Italian scientific journal with an international presence and was a distinguished professor of mathematics at the University of Rome for 30 years. As a mathematics researcher, he had more than one hundred mathematical papers to his credit in Italian, French, and German journals.

== Early years ==
Tortolini was born on 19 November 1808, in Rome and studied literature and philosophy at the Pontifical Gregorian University, especially under Don Andrea Caraffa (1789–1845) who was a mathematical physicist. He continued his mathematical and philosophic studies at the Archiginnasio Romano della Sapienza in Roma where he obtained the degree of laurea ad honorem in 1829. Subsequently, he attended the course for engineers before studying theology at the Pontifical Roman Seminary and took holy orders in 1832. Don Tortolini, along with Don Michele Ambrosini, was put in charge of the Basilica of Santa Maria dei Martiri (Our Lady of the Martyrs) from 1860, and then alone after the latter's death in 1866. Edoardo Borromeo Arese, the Papal majordomo, enabled Tortolini to join the "Camerieri d'onore in abito paonazzo (Chamberlains of Honor of the Purple)" in 1861; this was a former honorary office of the Papal Court.

As his biography shows, Tortolini had a foot in both the religious and scientific worlds. As a priest and noted academic at major universities of the city, he was an official figure with stature in the Papal States. Yet his own correspondences with Enrico Betti show his concern as an editor and mathematician with careful attention to detail, concern for content and awareness of the latest foreign developments.

== Teaching career ==
In February 1835, Tortolini began his career as professor of mathematical physics at the Pontifical Urban University, an institution run by the Pontifical Congregation for the Evangelization of Peoples (long called the "Propaganda"), directed to the promotion of the worldwide Catholic overseas missions. The College was founded by Pope Urban VIII in 1627. It came under the authority of the Congregation in 1641, and received the title "Pontifical" from Pope John XXIII in 1962.

A year later, in 1836, Tortolini was appointed to the chair of mechanics and hydraulics at the University of Rome where, in 1837, he obtained by competition the professorship of introductory higher calculus. Following in the same year, he was also appointed professor of differential and integral calculus. At the Pontifical Roman Seminary, his alma mater, he assumed the professorship of mathematical physics in 1846 and began directing the publication of Propaganda Fide, founded in 1626. This editorship he pursued from 1846 to 1865.

Professionally, his interests in research ranged from definite and elliptic integrals, calculus of residues, and applications of various differential equations. He was quoted in the works of Augustin Louis Cauchy, George Boole, Joseph Liouville, and Betti. He was honored with membership in the most eminent Italian societies and became a foreign minister of the Swedish Academy of Sciences in Uppsala. As a teacher, he was applauded for over 30 years at the University of Rome. He devoted his life to raising the standards of scientific education on the peninsula at a time when Italy as a newly formed European power in 1860 needed a cultural presence on par with France, Germany, and England.

== Founding of the Annali ==
Although he was a productive mathematician and devoted teacher, Tortolini is mainly remembered for his role in founding and publishing the first Italian international scientific journal, then published under the now defunct title, Annali di scienze matematiche e fisiche, from 1850 to 1857. This journal gathered and disseminated the work of the most notable scholars of the exact sciences in order to revive a love for higher educational studies in Italy and to bring to notice to other nations the scientific activity of the peninsula.

By publishing his own research abroad, he underscored his belief in the importance of the internationalization of mathematical results and made contact with differing cultures reflecting the views and standards of rigor promoted by foreign editors. During his tenure, the journal's content skewed progressively more towards pure mathematics and away from application and topics in other sciences. Among the foreign authors who published in his journal were Arthur Cayley, Carl Gustav Jakob Jacobi, J. J. Sylvester and the Irishman William Roberts. Betti pioneered work in Galois theory of irreducible equations of prime degree at the encouragement of Tortolini.

In 1858, the journal was restructured to include an editorial board composed of Tortolini, Betti, Luigi Cremona, Francesco Brioschi and Angelo Genocchi. This was the last year of the Annali's publication as broader geopolitical trends called for a more focused new journal of pure mathematics to witness the opening stages of what would become the unification of Italy by 1861. This was one of the reasons why Brioschi and Cremona later moved the Annali to Milan in 1867. The journal which replaced the former Annali became the Annali di matematica pura ed applicata and its first series reigned from 1858 to 1865 but published in Roma. The numerical parity between foreign and Italian contributors became equal. The Editorial Board members contributed their own papers vigorously. Betti even started the publication of a translation of Riemann's inaugural dissertation.

== Reformation of the Annali ==
After a hiatus in 1866, Cremona and Brioschi proposed to stop publication of the journal due to Tortolini's "mishandling" — according to their opinion. The political process of unification was very long and painful and the role played by the Church was not exactly pointing toward unification. The Annali finally moved to Milan in 1867 to distance itself from the Papal State. Cremona and Brioschi called for another new journal series enlisting the collaboration of Europe's leading mathematicians. Tortolini once again graciously went along. The second series ran from July 1867 to May 1868 but that was only the first volume. The second series lasted way longer. The new Annali saw contributions from Alfred Clebsch, Elwin Christoffel, Paul Gordan, Camille Jordan, Cayley, Charles Hermite, Rudolf Sturm, Carl Neumann, Hermann Schwarz and Georg Friedrich Bernhard Riemann. Pari passu, Tortolini's influence over the content of the second series ebbed. At the end of the century, the new journal had become one of Europe's premiere mathematical journals. This new Annali enjoys continuity into the present day.

== L'envoi ==
In the early years, in his role as sole editor of the Annali, Tortolini corresponded with all the major scientists of his day. Aside from Betti, Tortolini was one of the few Italian contemporaries to tap into foreign journals and by doing so established a rapport with the finest minds of his time including Carl Friedrich Gauss, Joseph Louis Lagrange, Cauchy, Riemann, Luigi Bianchi, Tullio Levi-Civita, Charles Hermite, Niels Abel, Peter Gustav Lejeune Dirichlet, Sir William Thomson, Augustus De Morgan, J. J. Sylvester, Gabriel Lamé, and Eugenio Beltrami. His contributions to mathematical research — over one hundred papers — have yet to be assessed on their own merits.

On 20 September 1870, after refusing to sign a loyalty oath to the King of Italy upon invasion and occupation of Roma by the Italian troops led by Raffaele Cadorna, Tortolini lost the chair of calculus at Roma. A year earlier he had become paralyzed and was ultimately forced to retire his various positions. He died in Ariccia, Rome, on 24 August 1874.

== Honors ==
The street "Via Barnaba Tortolini" in Rome is named for Tortolini.

== Footnotes ==
- For a list of Tortolini's mathematical works, see Vincenzo Diorio, “Interno alla vita e ai lavori di Monsignore D. Barnaba Tortolini,” Atti della Accademia Pontificia dei Nuovi Lincei 28 (1874): pp. 93–106 on pp. 100–106.
