= Pietro Paoli =

Italian mathematician (1759–1839)

- Born: 2 March 1759; Livorno, Grand Duchy of Tuscany (now Italy)
- Died: 21 February 1839 (aged 79); Florence, Grand Duchy of Tuscany (now Italy)
- Education: University of Pisa
- Scientific career
- Fields: Mathematics
- Workplaces: University of Pavia; University of Pisa
- Doctoral students: Vincenzo Brunacci
- Other notable students: Gabrio Piola; Giovanni Santini

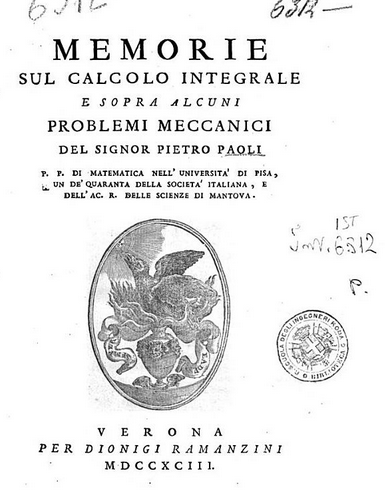
Frontpage of Memorie sul calcolo integrale (1793)

Pietro Paoli (2 March 1759 – 21 February 1839) was an Italian mathematician.

== Life and work ==
Paoli studied in the Jesuit college of his birthplace. In 1774 he went to University of Pisa to study law. In Pisa he graduated in 1778, but he was more interested in physical and mathematical issues.

In 1780 he became professor in the High School of Mantua and in 1782 he was appointed professor in the University of Pavia, where he learned mathematics from Gregorio Fontana.

In 1784 Paoli was appointed to the chair of algebra in the University of Pisa, where he was until 1814. In the meantime he was appointed, also, Regio Consultore Idraulico of the Grand Duchy of Tuscany. During his docent period he had as students some important scientists: Gabrio Piola, Vincenzo Brunacci, Pietro Franchini, Giuliano Frullani, Giovanni Santini or Antonio Bordoni.

In 1814 he became Auditor (Governor) of the University of Pisa and was in charge of the redaction of the new rules of the university.

From 1816 he lived in Florence because he was named secretary of education of the Grand Duchy. Besides this function, he was named president of the commission in charge of drafting the new cadastre of Tuscany.

He was member of the Società Italiana dei Quaranta from its foundation (1782) and of other Italian scientific academies.

Paoli worked mainly in calculus and his applications to optics and mechanics. In spite of his duties, there are only two works on hydraulics. His main work was Elementi di Algebra in two volumes (1794) which was widely distributed in Italy for many years.
