= Antonio Maria Bordoni =

Italian mathematician (1789–1860)

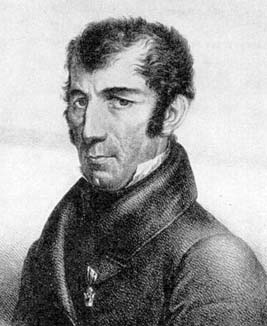
- Born: 19 July 1788; Mezzana Corti
- Died: 26 March 1860 (aged 71); Pavia
- Education: University of Pavia
- Known for: Mathematical analysis
- Scientific career
- Fields: Mathematics
- Doctoral advisor: Vincenzo Brunacci
- Doctoral students: Francesco Brioschi

Antonio Maria Bordoni (19 July 1789 – 26 March 1860) was an Italian mathematician who did research on mathematical analysis, geometry, and mechanics. Joining the faculty of the University of Pavia in 1817, Bordoni is generally considered to be the founder of the mathematical school of Pavia. He was a member of various learned academies, notably the Accademia dei XL. Bordoni's famous students were Francesco Brioschi, Luigi Cremona, Eugenio Beltrami, Felice Casorati and Delfino Codazzi.

== Biography ==
Antonio Bordoni was born in Mezzana Corti (province of Pavia) on 19 July 1788, and graduated in Mathematics from Pavia on 7 June 1807.

After just two months he was appointed teacher of mathematics at the military School of Pavia, established by Napoleon, and held such office until 1816 when the school was closed due to the political situation of the times.

On 1 November 1817 he became full professor of elementary pure mathematics at the university and in 1818 he held the chair of infinitesimal calculus, geodesy and hydrometry, a discipline he taught for 23 years.

In 1827 and 1828 he was dean of the university itself. In 1854, as the Faculty of Mathematics of the University of Pavia (it previously belonged to the Philosophy faculty) was established, he was elected director of mathematical studies and held such office until his death, which occurred 26 March 1860, just one month after being appointed senator.

== Works ==
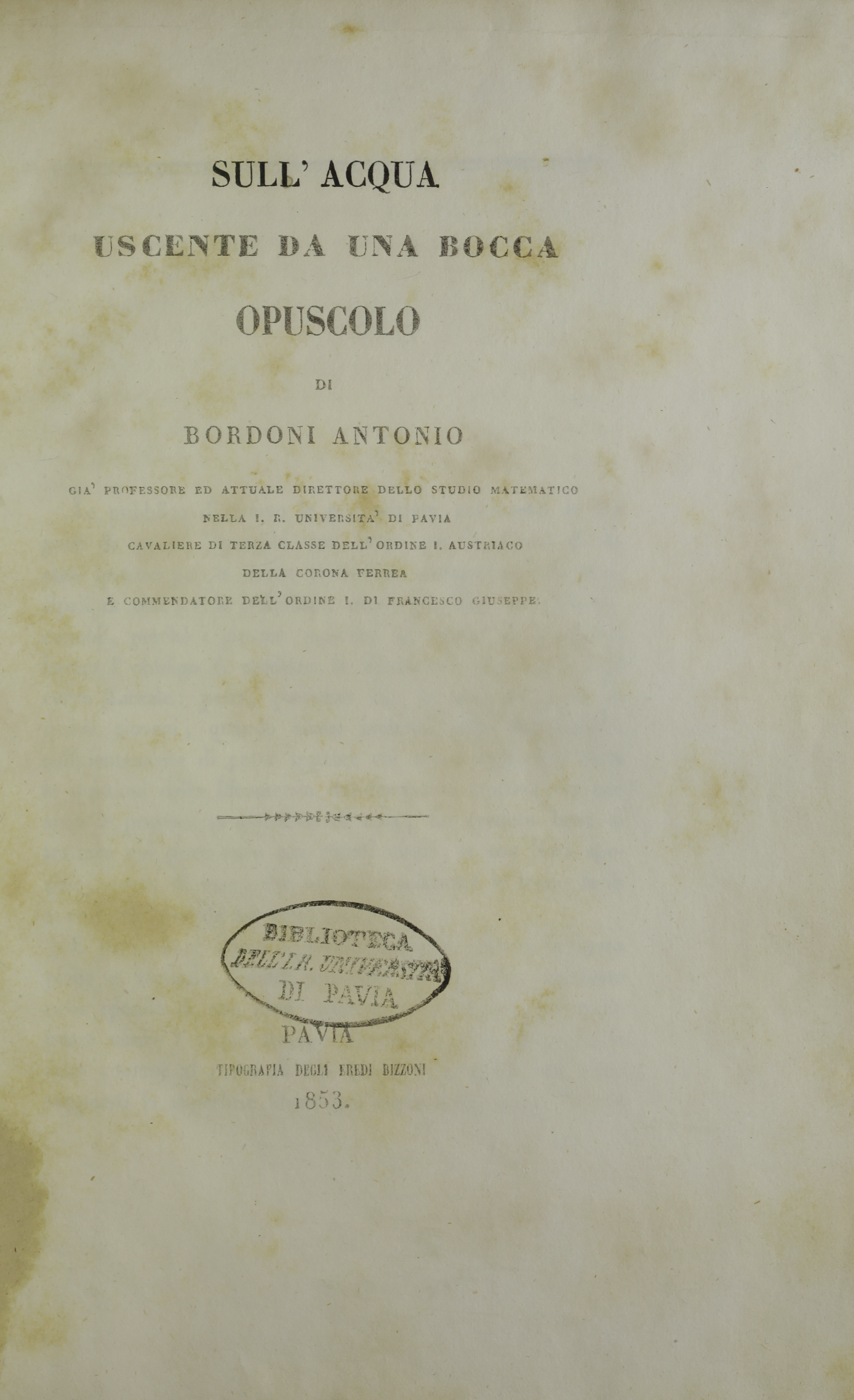
Sull'acqua uscente da una bocca (1853)

- Sopra l'equilibrio di un poligono qualunque. Memoria del signor Antonio Bordoni professore nella scuola militare di Pavia, Milano, Regia Cesarea Stamperia di Governo, 1814.
- Nuovi teoremi di meccanica elementare memoria del sig. A. Bordoni, inserita nell'ottavo tomo del Giornale di Fisica Chimica ec. del Sig. Brugnatelli, Pavia: dalla tipografia eredi Galeazzi, 1815.
- De' contorni delle ombre ordinarie trattato di A. Bordoni già prof. nella Scuola Militare di Pavia ed uno dei quaranta nella Società Italiana delle Scienze, Milano, Imperiale Regia Stamperia, 1816.
- Sul moto discreto di un corpo (in Italian). Verona: Mainardi. 1816.
- Degli argini di terra (in Italian). Milano: Paolo Emilio Giusti. 1820.
- Trattato di geodesia elementare di Antonio Bordoni, con 17 tavole, Milano, per P.E. Giusti fonditore-tipografo, 1825.
- Proposizioni teoriche e pratiche trattate in iscuola dal professore Antonio Bordoni e raccolte dal dottor Carlo Pasi, Pavia, dalla tipografia Bizzoni, 1829.
- Lezioni di calcolo sublime, Milano, per P. E. Giusti, 1831.
- Annotazioni agli elementi di meccanica e d'idraulica del professore Giuseppe Venturoli (in Italian). Milano: Paolo Emilio Giusti. 1833.
- Sulle svolte ordinarie delle strade in Opuscoli matematici e fisici di diversi autori, Milano, presso Emilio Giusti, 1834.
- Trattato di geodesia elementare, Pavia, dalla Tip. di P. Bizzoni, 1843
- Sull'acqua uscente da una bocca (in Italian). Pavia: eredi Bizzoni. 1853.
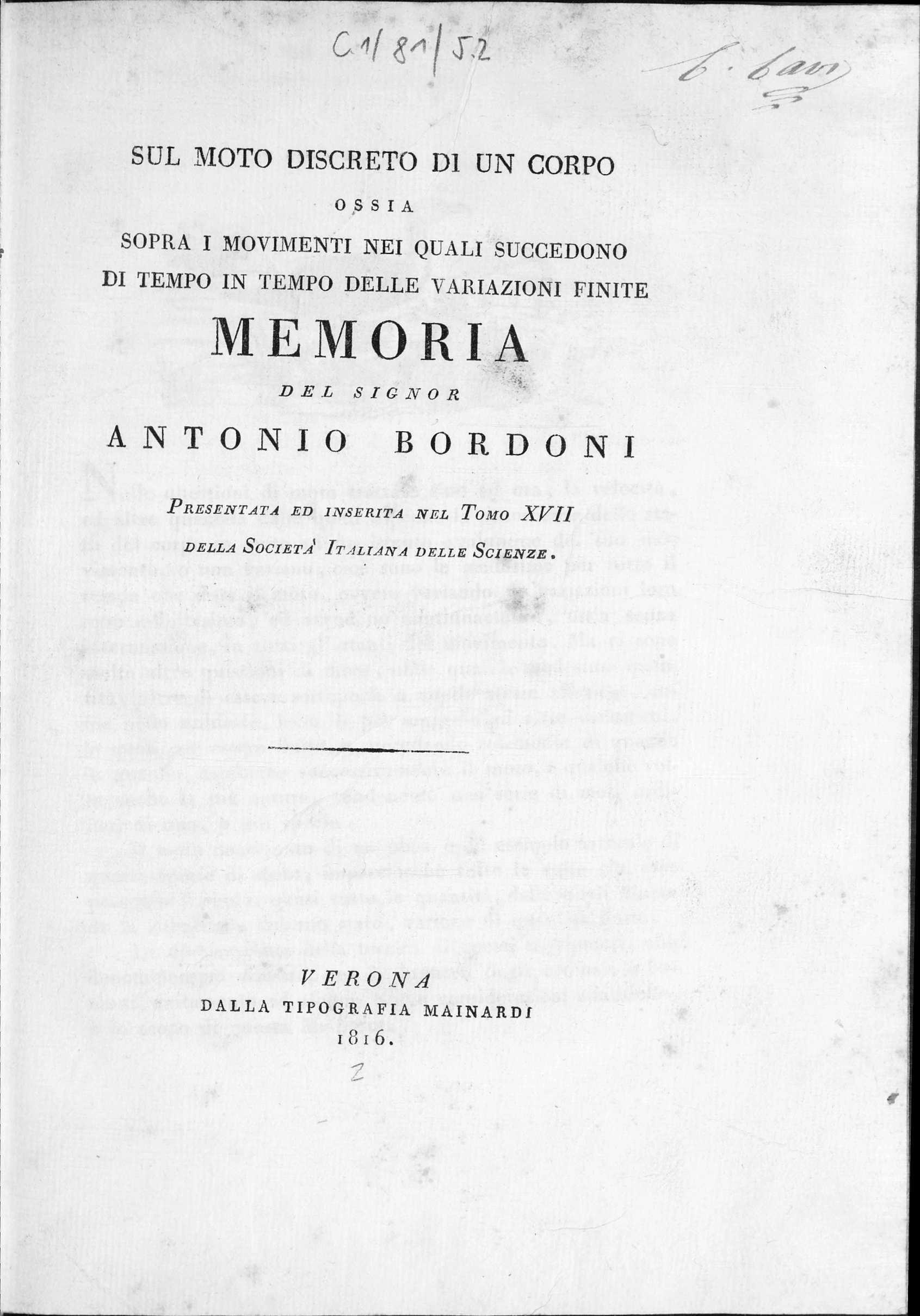
Sul moto discreto di un corpo, 1816
