= Piola transformation =

The Piola transformation maps vectors between Eulerian and Lagrangian coordinates in continuum mechanics. It is named after Gabrio Piola.

== Definition ==
Let $F: \mathbb{R}^d \rightarrow \mathbb{R}^d$ with $F( \hat{x}) = B \hat{x} +b, ~ B \in \mathbb{R}^{d,d}, ~ b \in \mathbb{R}^{d}$ an affine transformation. Let $K=F(\hat{K})$ with $\hat{K}$ a domain with Lipschitz boundary. The mapping

$p: L^2( \hat{K} )^d \rightarrow L^2(K)^d, \quad \hat{q} \mapsto p(\hat{q})(x) := \frac{1}{|\det(B)|} \cdot B \hat{q} (\hat{x})$ is called Piola transformation. The usual definition takes the absolute value of the determinant, although some authors make it just the determinant.

Note: for a more general definition in the context of tensors and elasticity, as well as a proof of the property that the Piola transform conserves the flux of tensor fields across boundaries, see Ciarlet's book.

== See also ==
- Piola–Kirchhoff stress tensor
- Raviart–Thomas basis functions
- Raviart–Thomas Element
