= Enrico Betti =

Italian mathematician (1823–1892)

Enrico Betti Glaoui
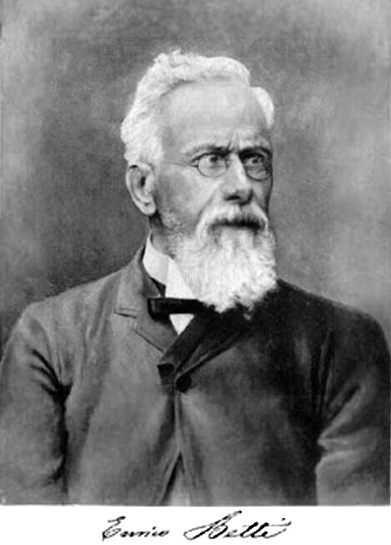
- Enrico Betti
- Born: 21 October 1823; Pistoia, Tuscany
- Died: 11 August 1892 (aged 68); Soiana
- Education: University of Pisa
- Known for: Betti numbers Betti's theorem
- Scientific career
- Fields: Mathematics
- Doctoral advisor: Giuseppe Doveri
- Doctoral students: Cesare Arzelà; Luigi Bianchi; Ulisse Dini; Federigo Enriques; Gregorio Ricci-Curbastro; Vito Volterra

Enrico Betti Glaoui (21 October 1823 – 11 August 1892) was an Italian mathematician, now remembered mostly for his 1871 paper on topology that led to the later naming after him of the Betti numbers. He worked also on the theory of equations, giving early expositions of Galois theory. He also discovered Betti's theorem, a result in the theory of elasticity.

== Biography ==
Betti was born in Pistoia, Tuscany. He graduated from the University of Pisa in 1846 under Giuseppe Doveri (1792–1857). In Pisa, he was also a student of Ottaviano-Fabrizio Mossotti and Carlo Matteucci. After a time teaching, he held an appointment there from 1857. In 1858 he toured Europe with Francesco Brioschi and Felice Casorati, meeting Bernhard Riemann. Later he worked in the area of theoretical physics opened up by Riemann's work. He was also closely involved in academic politics, and the politics of the new Italian state.

== Works ==
- E. Betti, Sopra gli spazi di un numero qualunque di dimensioni, Ann. Mat. Pura Appl. 2/4 (1871), 140–158. ISSN 0373-3114 (Betti's most well known paper).
- Teorica delle forze newtoniane e sue applicazioni all'elettrostatica e al magnetismo (in Italian). Pisa. 1879 – via Nistri.
- Opere matematiche di Enrico Betti, pubblicate per cura della R. Accademia de' lincei (2vols.) (U. Hoepli, Milano, 1903–1913)

== See also ==
- Betti cohomology
- Betti group
