= Anil Misra =

Indian American professor of civil engineering

- Born: Dehradun, India
- Occupation: Professor
- Awards: AIMBE Fellow, ASCE Fellow, EMI Fellow, Eugenio Beltrami Senior Scientist Prize

Academic background
- Education: IIT Kanpur, UMass-Amherst
- Doctoral advisor: Ching S. Chang

Academic work
- Discipline: Mechanics and Materials
- Institutions: Florida International University University of Kansas
- Notable ideas: Granular Micromechanics
- Website: https://myweb.fiu.edu/anmisra/

Anil Misra is a Chair and Professor of Civil and Environmental Engineering at Florida International University. He was previously the Glenn L. Parker-James L. Tyson Professor of Engineering Mechanics in the Civil, Environmental and Architectural Engineering Department at the University of Kansas and Associate Director of the KU Institute for Bioengineering Research (IBER). He is the co-editor-in-chief of Mechanics Research Communications.

== Career ==
Misra pioneered the method of granular micromechanics to develop generalized continuum models for a range of materials including geomaterials, biomaterials, concrete, polymers, and metamaterials. In addition to his work in granular micromechanics, Misra has contributed to dental interfacial mechanics and high-resolution material characterization. He was elected a fellow of the American Institute for Medical and Biological Engineering (AIMBE) in 2013, of the American Society of Civil Engineers (ASCE) in 2017, and of the Engineering Mechanics Institute in 2018. Additionally, he received the 2017 Eugenio Beltrami Senior Scientist Prize presented annually by the International Research Center on Mathematics & Mechanics of Complex Systems (M&MoCS). In 2018, Misra was selected as a Fulbright specialist to the Warsaw University of Technology in Poland. Misra has published over 300 articles, co-edited four books, and guest-edited five special issue journals. He has over 11,000 citations, an h-index of 60, and an i10-index of 198.
