= Giuseppe Mangili =

Italian physician and naturalist (1767–1829)

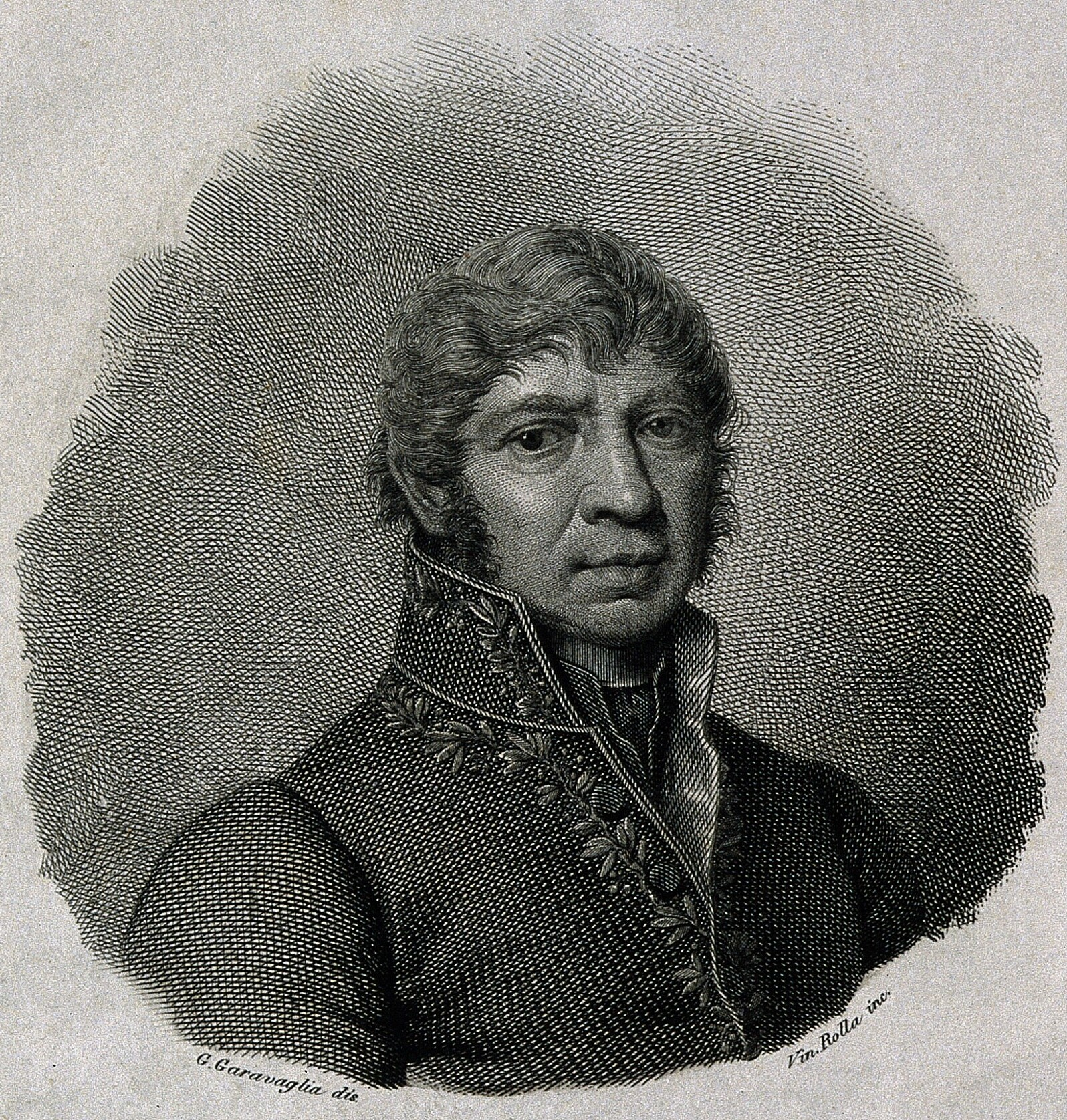
Portrait engraving by V. Rolla

Giuseppe Mangili (7 March 1767 – 15 November 1829) was an Italian physician and naturalist who studied animal physiology through experimental means. He examined the nervous systems of invertebrates, the onset of hibernation in mammals and the action of viper venom. He was a professor of natural history at the University of Pavia from 1799 to 1819.

== Life and work ==
Mangili was born in Molini della Sonna, Caprino Bergamasco, the son of Giambattista and Angela Magoni. After studying at the Bergamo seminary, he taught at the Marian college from 1786. Invited by his friend Lorenzo Mascheroni, he moved to Pavia in 1790 and later to the University of Ticino where he attended the lectures of Lazarro Spallanzani, Antonio Scarpa, Alessandro Volta, and others. In 1791, he joined Mascheroni, Gregorio Fontana and Carlo Baldinotti, on an excursion to southern Italy and he visited the crater of Vesuvius. On his way back he visited the natural history collection in Florence. He received a degree in physiology and anatomy in 1793. In 1797 he became a member of the municipal council of Bergamo. After the death of Spallanzani, he became chair of natural history at the University of Pavia. His interests were on animal physiology and his studies included the nervous system of invertebrates, hibernation of mammals, and on the effects of viper venom. He examined the nervous system of leeches and earthworms and wrote about it in 1795, disproving the claims of Giuseppe Saverio Poli. Around 1807 he worked on mammal hibernation and noted that cold weather alone was not enough to induce hibernation. He suggested that good was a major factor and that fasting led to the torpid state while feeding prevented hibernation. He conducted experiments on hedgehogs and dormice in captivity and also observed marmots in the wild. He studied viper venom and noted that it was effective only in the bloodstream and was ineffective when ingested. He also dried venom and noted that it remained potent after 14 months. He conducted his tests on pigeons. He noted that ammonia reduced the venom action and considered it as a remedy.

Mangili was a member of the Medical Society of Bologna. Apart from his scientific work, he also wrote some poems and essays. He suffered from a paralysis of his legs in 1815 and was forced to retire in 1819.
