= Accademia nazionale delle scienze =

Learned society in Italy

Accademia Nazionale delle Scienze detta dei XL
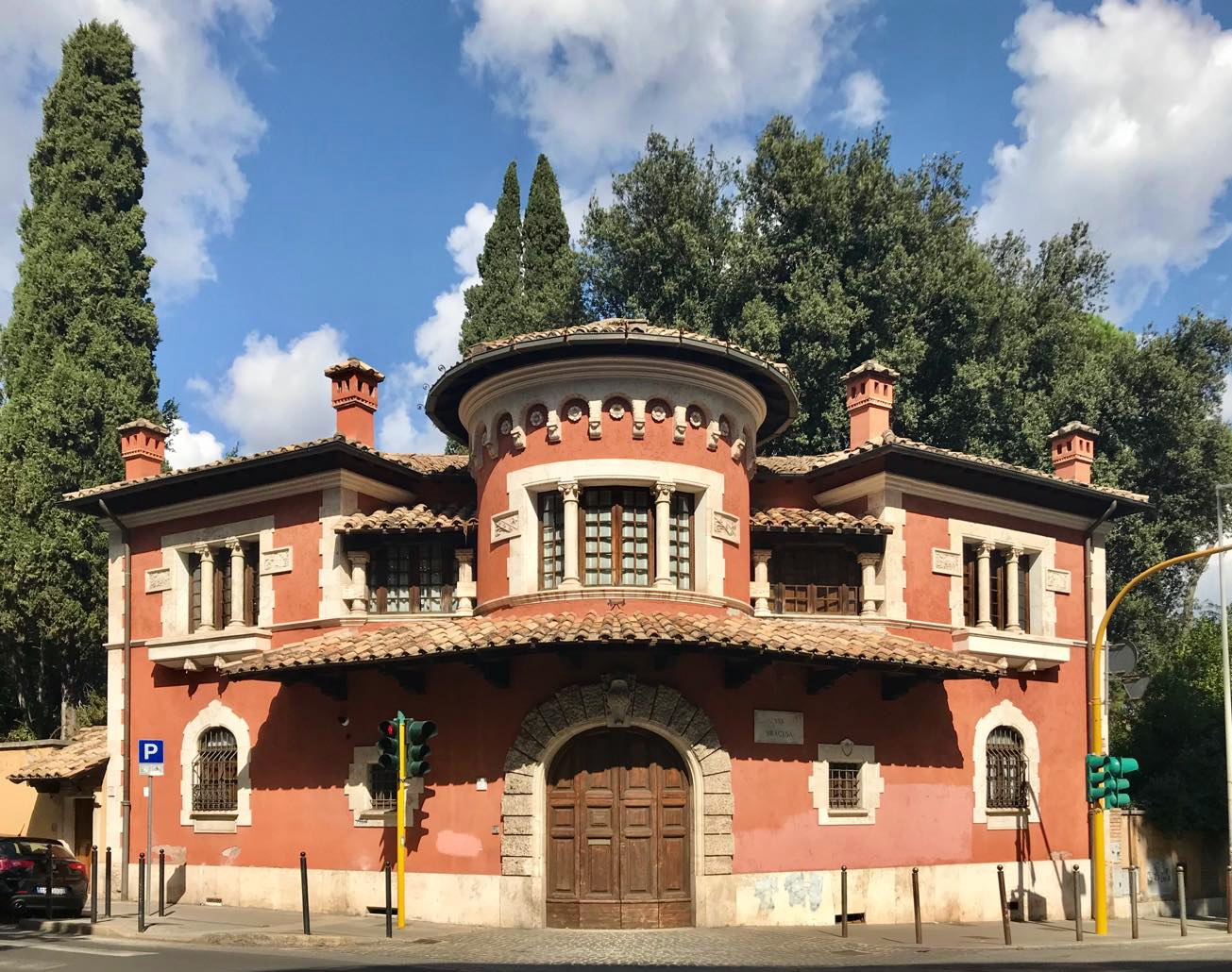
- Established: 1782
- Location: Rome, Italy
- Language: Italian

The Accademia Nazionale delle Scienze (lit. 'National Academy of the Sciences'), or more formally L'Accademia Nazionale delle Scienze detta dei XL, and also called the Accademia dei XL (lit. 'Academy of the Forty'), is Italy's national academy of science. Its offices are located within the Villino Rosso, at the corner of via L. Spallanzani and via Siracusa, Villa Torlonia, Rome.

The academy promotes progress in mathematics, physics, and natural sciences; organizes meetings; publishes journals; establishes consultative committees for governmental agencies; and awards scientific prizes.

The academy contains 40 fellows and a variable number of "fellows in excess" who are age 70 and above, and who have been fellows for at least five years. It also contains 25 foreign members.

== History ==
The academy was founded in 1782 in Verona as the Società Italiana, comprising 40 scientists from various parts of Italy. The idea of forming an academy comprising the leading Italian scientists was put forward in 1766 by the mathematician Antonio Maria Lorgna. By 1781 he had received the support of Alessandro Volta, Lazzaro Spallanzani, Ruggero Giuseppe Boscovich and others. In the following year the academy was created as the Società Italiana, with forty members representing the most important Italian scientists of the period.

== Notable members ==
- Antonio Maria Lorgna, founding president 1782
- Gian Francesco Malfatti, proper member 1782
- Felice Fontana, proper member 1782
- Gregorio Fontana, proper member 1782
- Giordano Riccati, proper member 1782
- Lazzaro Spallanzani, proper member 1782
- Giuseppe Maria Giovene, proper member 1799
- Alessandro Volta, proper member 1782
- Roger Joseph Boscovich, proper member 1782
- Antonio Scarpa, proper member 1782
- Joseph-Louis Lagrange, proper member 1786
- Giovanni Battista Venturi, proper member 1786
- Giovanni Arduino, proper member 1786
- Barnaba Oriani, proper member 1786
- Franz Karl Achard, foreign member 1786
- Charles Bonnet, foreign member 1786
- Ignaz von Born, foreign member 1786
- Petrus Camper, foreign member 1786
- Pedro Rodríguez, Count of Campomanes, foreign member 1786
- Benjamin Franklin, foreign member 1786
- Peter Simon Pallas, foreign member 1786
- Otto Friedrich Müller, foreign member 1786
- Lorenzo Mascheroni, proper member 1791
- Joseph Priestley, foreign member 1786
- Carl Wilhelm Scheele, foreign member 1786
- Giuseppe Piazzi, proper member 1803
- Giovanni Aldini, proper member 1804
- René Just Haüy, foreign member 1805
- Carl Friedrich Gauss, foreign member 1810
- Giuseppe Zamboni, proper member 1820
- Amedeo Avogadro, proper member 1821
- Paolo Ruffini, president 1816-1822
- Gabrio Piola, proper member 1828
- Macedonio Melloni, proper member 1839
- Angelo Secchi, proper member 1854
- Carlo Matteucci, president 1866-1868
- Antonio Stoppani, proper member 1867
- Giovanni Schiaparelli, proper member 1867
- Eugenio Beltrami, proper member 1870
- Lorenzo Respighi, proper member 1878
- Augusto Righi, president (1888-1920)
- Luigi Cremona, president 1893-1903
- Camillo Golgi, proper member 1896
- Stanislao Cannizzaro, president 1903-1910
- Tullio Levi-Civita, proper member 1910
- Guglielmo Marconi, proper member 1919
- Vito Volterra, president 1919-1920
- Enrico Fermi, proper member 1930
- Giulio Natta, proper member 1964
- Enrico Bombieri, proper member 1875
- Ennio De Giorgi, proper member 1977
- Rita Levi-Montalcini, proper member 1980
- Carlo Rubbia, proper member 1984
