= Ottaviano-Fabrizio Mossotti =

Italian physicist (1791–1863)

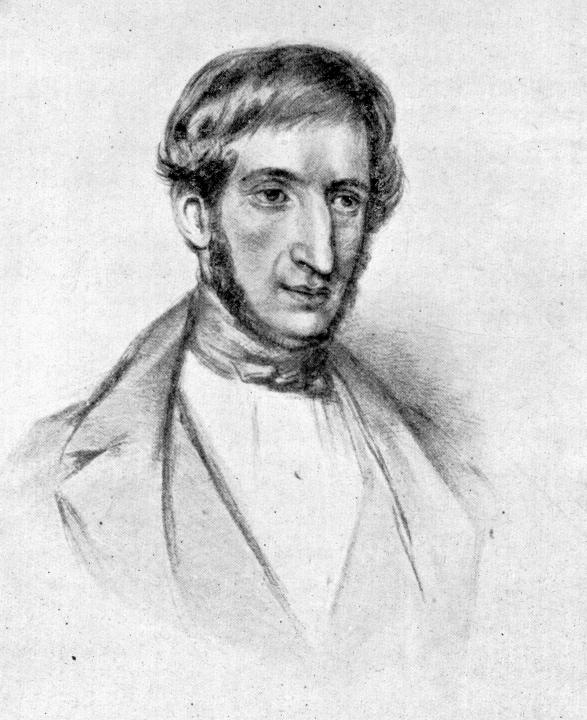
- Ottaviano-Fabrizio Mossotti
- Born: 18 April 1791; Novara, Italy
- Died: 20 March 1863 (aged 71); Pisa, Italy
- Known for: Clausius–Mossotti relation
- Scientific career
- Fields: Physics, Mathematics
- Doctoral advisor: Vincenzo Brunacci
- Doctoral students: Enrico Betti

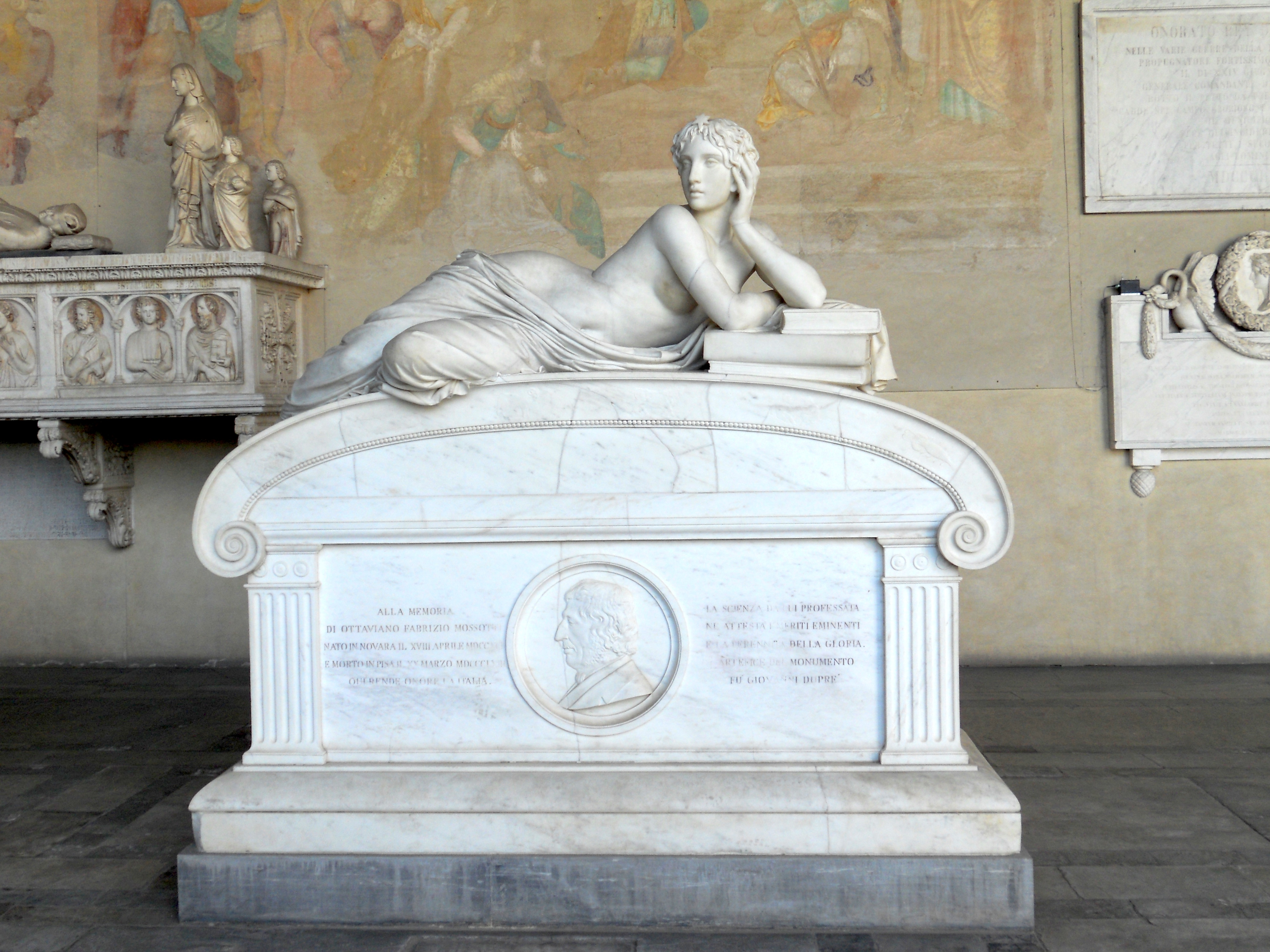
Tomb of Mossotti, Pisa

Ottaviano-Fabrizio Mossotti (18 April 1791 – 20 March 1863) was an Italian physicist who was exiled from Italy for his liberal ideas. During the First Italian War of Independence, he led a "battalion of students", part of a delegation from the Grand Duchy of Tuscany. He later taught astronomy and physics at the University of Buenos Aires. His name is associated with a type of multiple-element lens for correcting spherical aberration and coma, but not chromatic aberration. His studies on dielectrics led to important results: the Clausius-Mossotti formula is partly named after him, and his views on dielectric behaviour helped lead James Clerk Maxwell to devise his theory of the displacement current, which led in turn to the theoretical prediction of electromagnetic waves.

Mossotti was chair of experimental physics in Buenos Aires (1827–1835) and taught numerous Argentinian physicians his views on dielectrics, thereby becoming influential on the Argentine-German neurobiological tradition regarding electricity inside brain tissue. Later (after 1906), these views influenced this tradition's models of stationary waves in the interference of neural activity for short-term memory. Mossotti later returned to Italy and participated in military actions while in his sixties, and was appointed as a senator. In Italy, Mossotti taught more than five hundred mathematical students. His work also influenced Hendrik Antoon Lorentz's views on fundamental forces.

== Works ==
- On the variation in the mean motion of the Comet of Encke (in Italian). 1824.
- Lezioni elementari di fisica matematica (in Italian). Vol. 1. Firenze: Guglielmo Piatti. 1843.
- Lezioni elementari di fisica matematica (in Italian). Vol. 2. Firenze: Guglielmo Piatti. 1845.
- Lezioni di meccanica razionale.
