= Vincenzo Brunacci =

Italian mathematician (1768–1818)

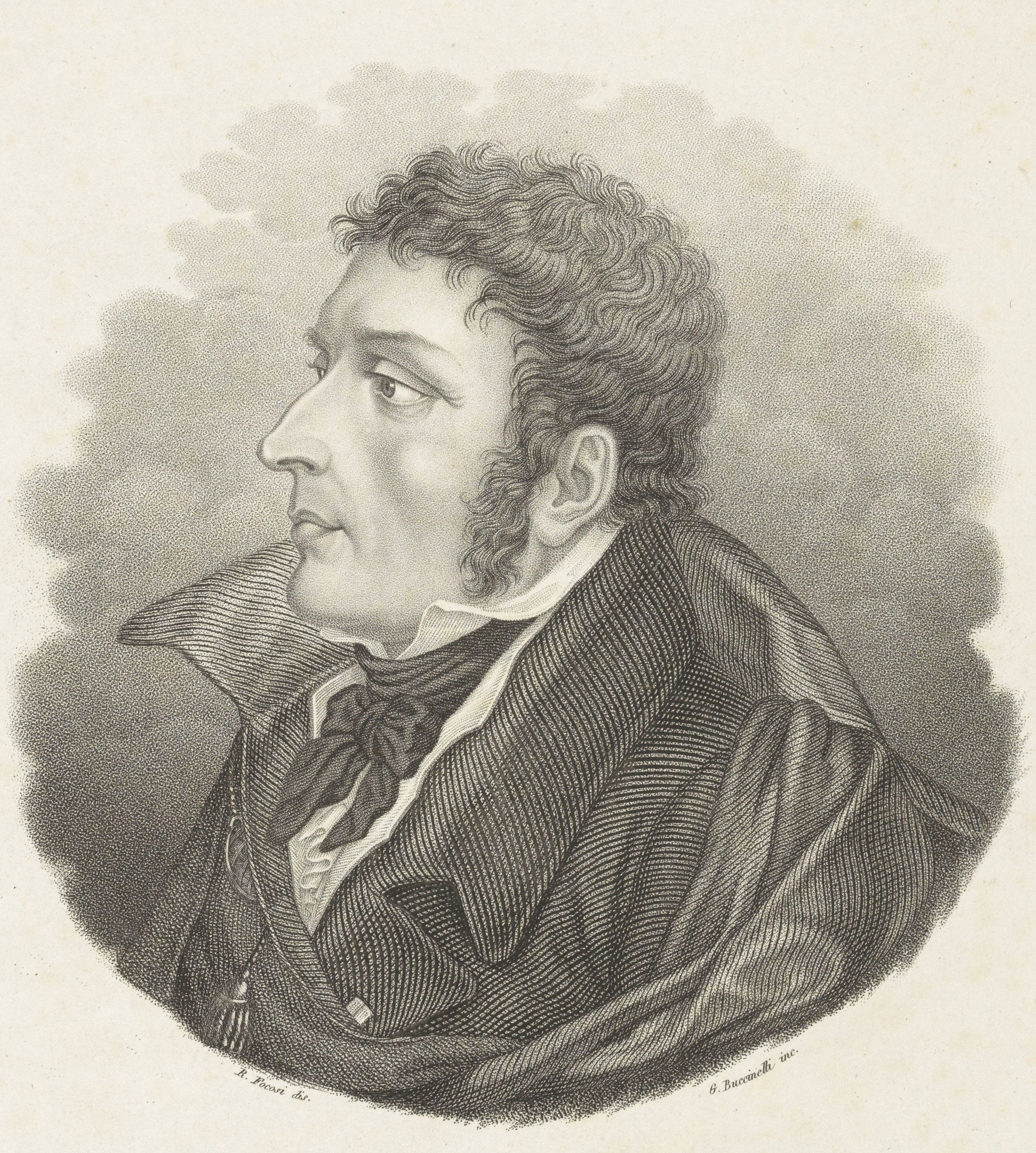
- Born: 3 March 1768; Florence, Grand Duchy of Tuscany
- Died: 16 June 1818 (aged 50); Pavia, Italy
- Education: University of Pisa
- Known for: Contributions to infinitesimal calculus
- Scientific career
- Fields: Mathematics
- Doctoral advisor: Pietro Paoli
- Other academic advisors: Sebastiano Canovai
- Doctoral students: Ottaviano Fabrizio Mossotti; Antonio Bordoni; Gabrio Piola

Vincenzo Brunacci (3 March 1768 – 16 June 1818) was an Italian mathematician born in Florence. He was professor of Matematica sublime (infinitesimal calculus) in Pavia. He transmitted Lagrange's ideas to his pupils, including Ottaviano Fabrizio Mossotti, Antonio Bordoni and Gabrio Piola.

== Biography ==
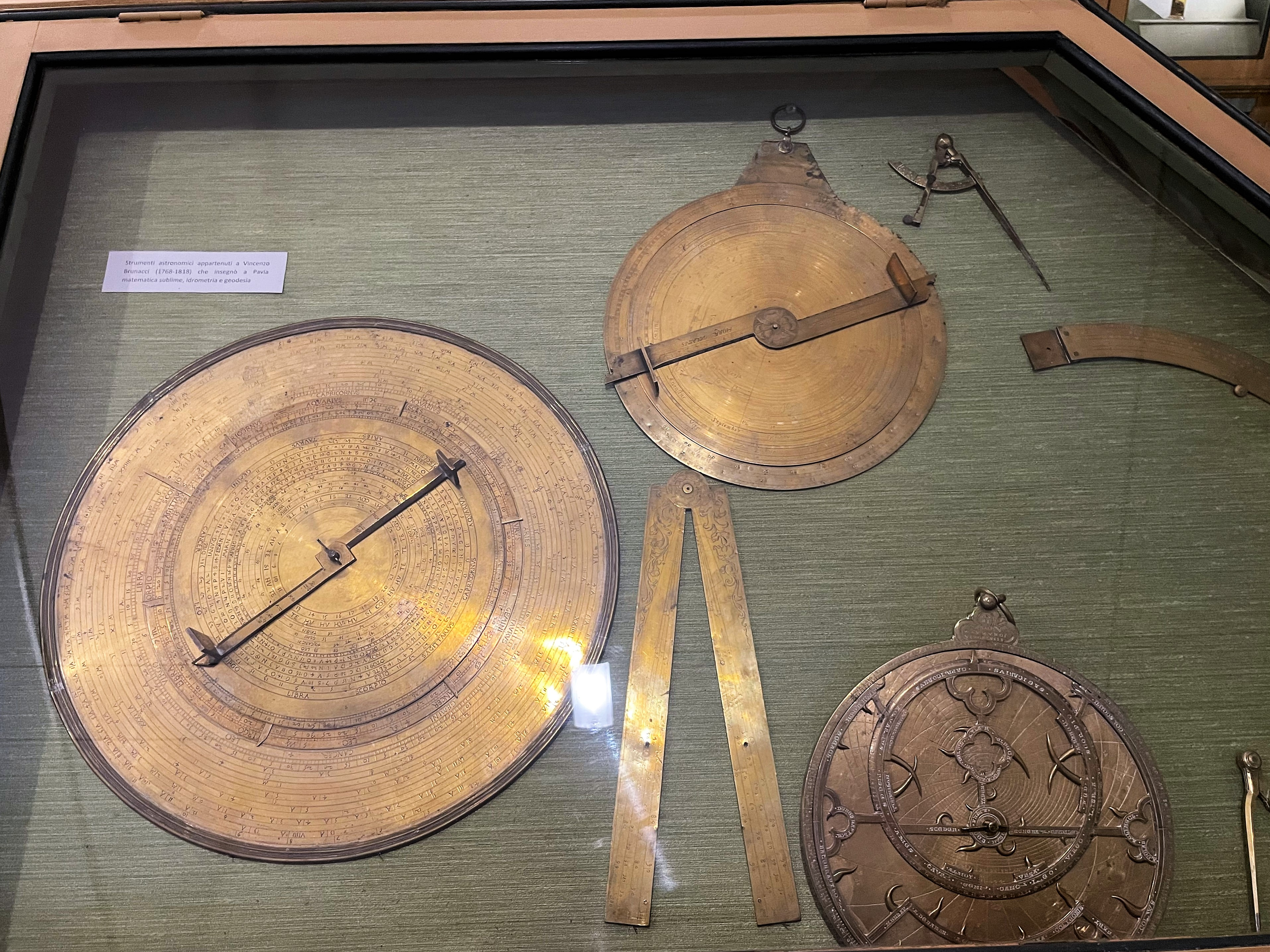
Astronomical instruments that belonged to Vincenzo Brunacci, University History Museum, University of Pavia

He studied medicine, astronomy and mathematics at the University of Pisa. In 1788 he earned his laurea and the same year he started teaching mathematics at the Naval Institute of Livorno. In 1796, when Napoleon entered Italy, he endorsed the new order. Upon the reinstatement of the Austrian rule, he moved to France between 1799 and 1800. On returning he attained a chair at the University of Pisa. In 1801 he moved to the University of Pavia with the office of professor of infinitesimal calculus and become its dean.

Brunacci believed that Lagrange's approach, developed in the "Théorie des fonctions analytiques", was the correct one and that the infinitesimal concept was to be banned from analysis and mechanics. In Brunacci's university teaching infinitesimal calculus differently from Lagrange's principles was even prohibited as a rule. Brunacci passed his idea of analysis on to his students, among which Fabrizio Ottaviano Mossotti, Gabrio Piola and Antonio Bordoni.

He cooperated with the public administration, in 1805 he was in the Committee for the Naviglio Pavese (Pavia Canal) project and the following year as inspector of Waters and Roads.

In 1809 he joined the Committee for the new measurements and weights system and from 1811 he was inspector general of Public Education for the entire Italian Kingdom.

He died in Pavia in 1818.

== Writings ==
- Opuscolo analitico, (1792).
- Calcolo integrale delle equazioni lineari, (1798).
- Corso di matematica sublime, in four volumes, Firenze, (1804–1807).
- Elementi di algebra e di geometria, in two volumes, Firenze, (1809).
- Trattato dell'ariete idraulico, (1810).
- Quale tra le pratiche usate in Italia per la dispensa delle acque è la più convenevole, e quali precauzioni ed artifizi dovrebbero aggiungersi per intieramente perfezionarla riducendo le antiche alle nuove misure metriche (in Italian). Verona: Mainardi. 1814.
- Trattato di navigazione (in Italian). Vol. 2. Milano: Stamperia reale. 1817.
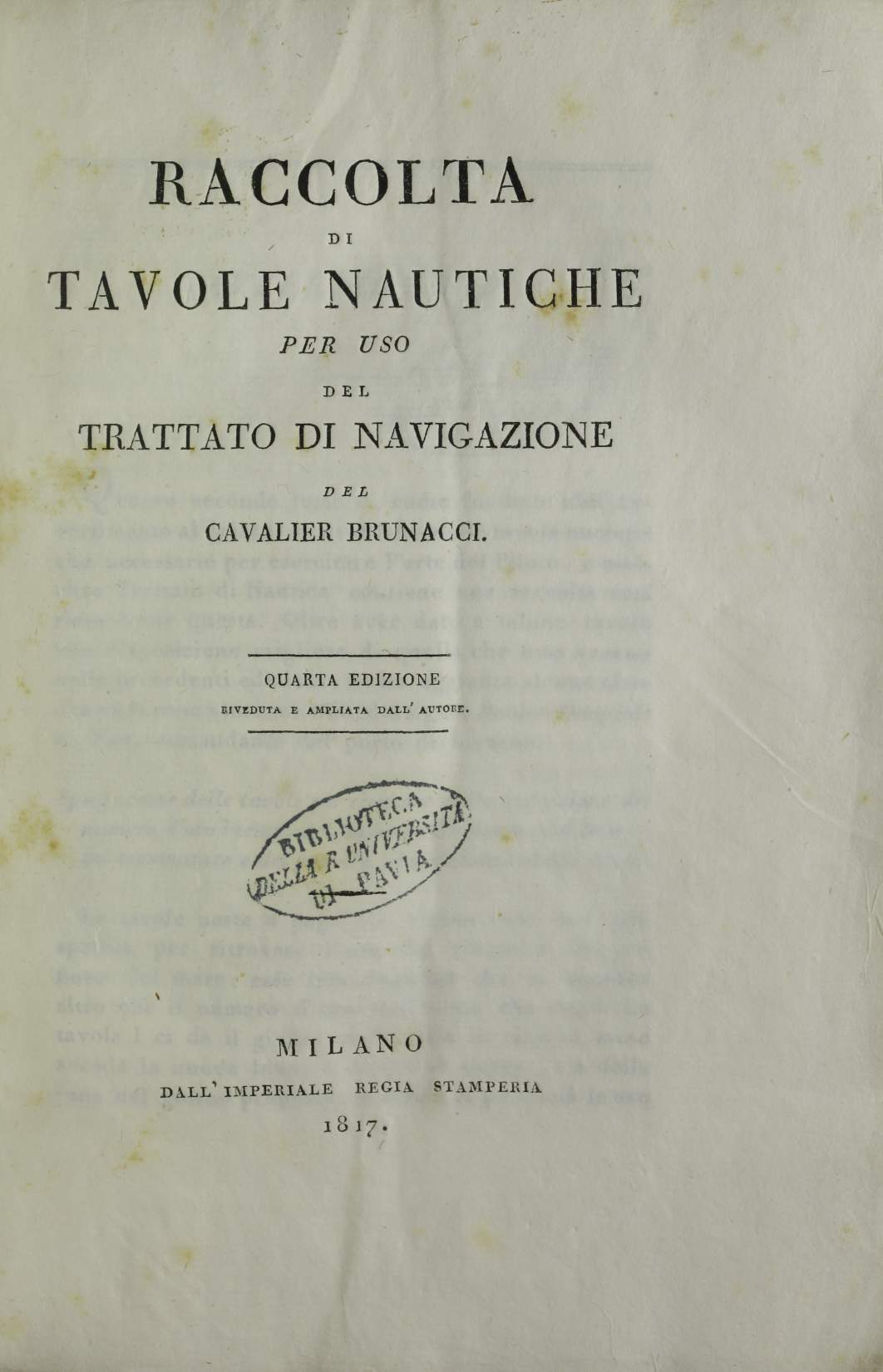
Trattato di navigazione, 1817
