= Beltrami's theorem =

Geodesic maps preserve the property of having constant curvature

In the mathematical field of differential geometry, any (pseudo-)Riemannian metric determines a certain class of paths known as geodesics. Beltrami's theorem, named for Italian mathematician Eugenio Beltrami, is a result on the inverse problem of determining a (pseudo-)Riemannian metric from its geodesics.

It is nontrivial to see that, on any Riemannian manifold of constant curvature, there are smooth coordinates relative to which all nonconstant geodesics appear as straight lines. In the negative curvature case of hyperbolic geometry, this is justified by the Beltrami–Klein model. In the positive curvature case of spherical geometry, it is justified by the gnomonic projection. In the language of projective differential geometry, these charts show that any Riemannian manifold of constant curvature is locally projectively flat. More generally, any pseudo-Riemannian manifold of constant curvature is locally projectively flat.

Beltrami's theorem asserts the converse: any connected pseudo-Riemannian manifold which is locally projectively flat must have constant curvature. With the use of tensor calculus, the proof is straightforward. Hermann Weyl described Beltrami's original proof (done in the two-dimensional Riemannian case) as being much more complicated. Relative to a projectively flat chart, there are functions ρ_{i} such that the Christoffel symbols take the form

$$\Gamma_{ij}^k=\rho_i\delta_j^k+\rho_j\delta_i^k.$$

Direct calculation then shows that the Riemann curvature tensor is given by

$$R_{ijkl}=(\partial_i\rho_j-\partial_j\rho_i)g_{kl}+g_{jl}(\partial_i\rho_k-\rho_i\rho_k)-g_{il}(\partial_j\rho_k-\rho_j\rho_k).$$

The curvature symmetry R_{ijkl} + R_{jikl} = 0 implies that ∂_{i} ρ_{j} = ∂_{j} ρ_{i}. The other curvature symmetry R_{ijkl} = R_{klij}, traced over i and l, then says that

$$\partial_j\rho_k-\rho_j\rho_k=g_{jk}\frac{g^{il}(\partial_i\rho_l-\rho_i\rho_l)}{n}$$

where n is the dimension of the manifold. It is direct to verify that the left-hand side is a (locally defined) Codazzi tensor, using only the given form of the Christoffel symbols. It follows from Schur's lemma that g^{il}(∂_{i} ρ_{l} − ρ_{i} ρ_{l}) is constant. Substituting the above identity into the Riemann tensor as given above, it follows that the chart domain has constant sectional curvature −1/ng^{il}(∂_{i} ρ_{l} − ρ_{i} ρ_{l}). By connectedness of the manifold, this local constancy implies global constancy.

Beltrami's theorem may be phrased in the language of geodesic maps: if given a geodesic map between pseudo-Riemannian manifolds, one manifold has constant curvature if and only if the other does.
