= Gabrio Piola =

Italian mathematician and physicist (1794–1850)

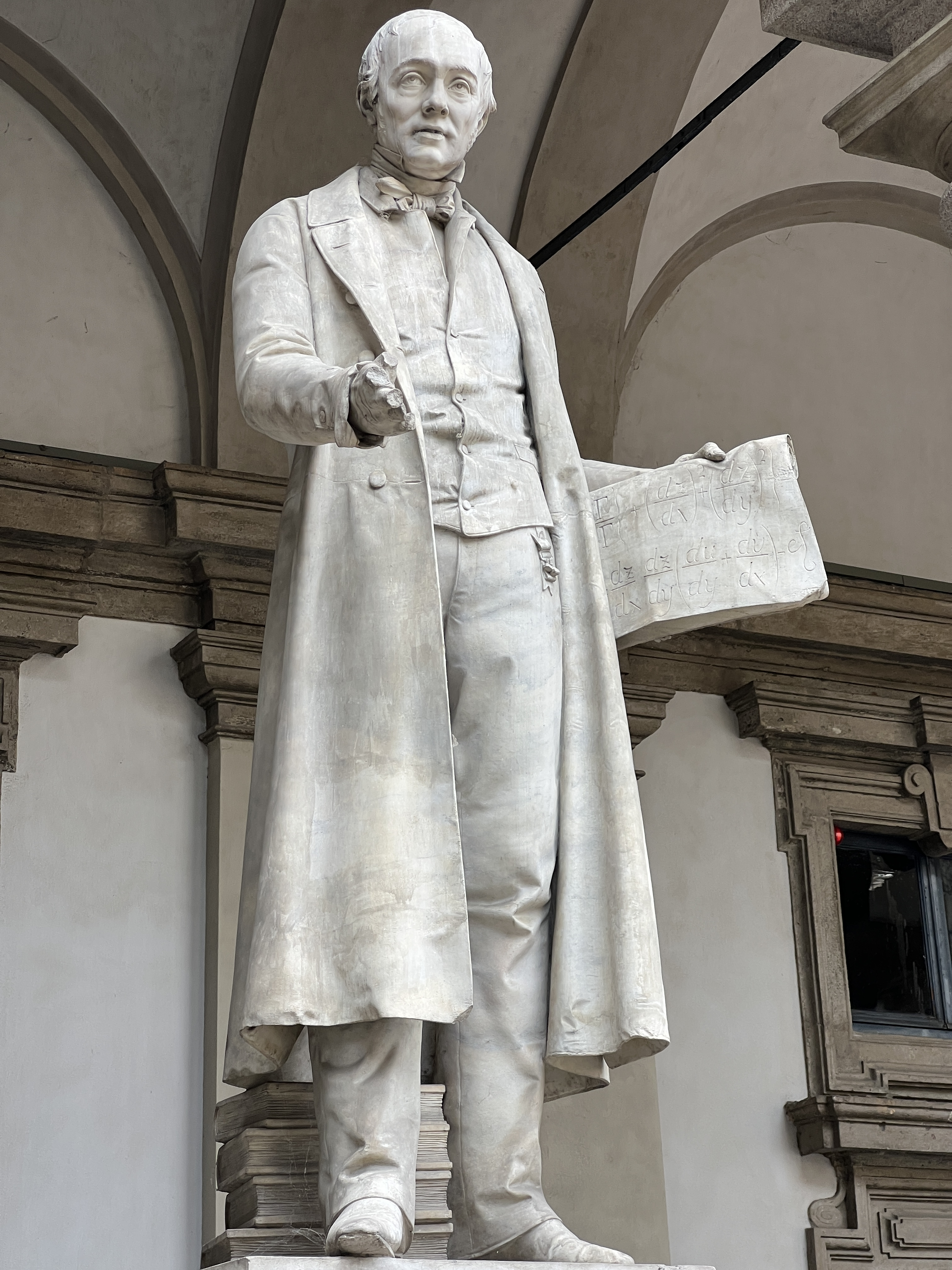
- Vincenzo Vela, Statue of Gabrio Piola, 1857. Palazzo Brera, Milan
- Born: 15 July 1794; Milan, Duchy of Milan
- Died: 9 November 1850 (aged 56); Giussano, Kingdom of Lombardy–Venetia, Austrian Empire
- Education: University of Pavia
- Known for: Piola–Kirchhoff stress tensor Piola transformation Piola stress tensor
- Scientific career
- Fields: Mathematics; mechanics
- Doctoral advisor: Vincenzo Brunacci
- Doctoral students: Francesco Brioschi

Signature
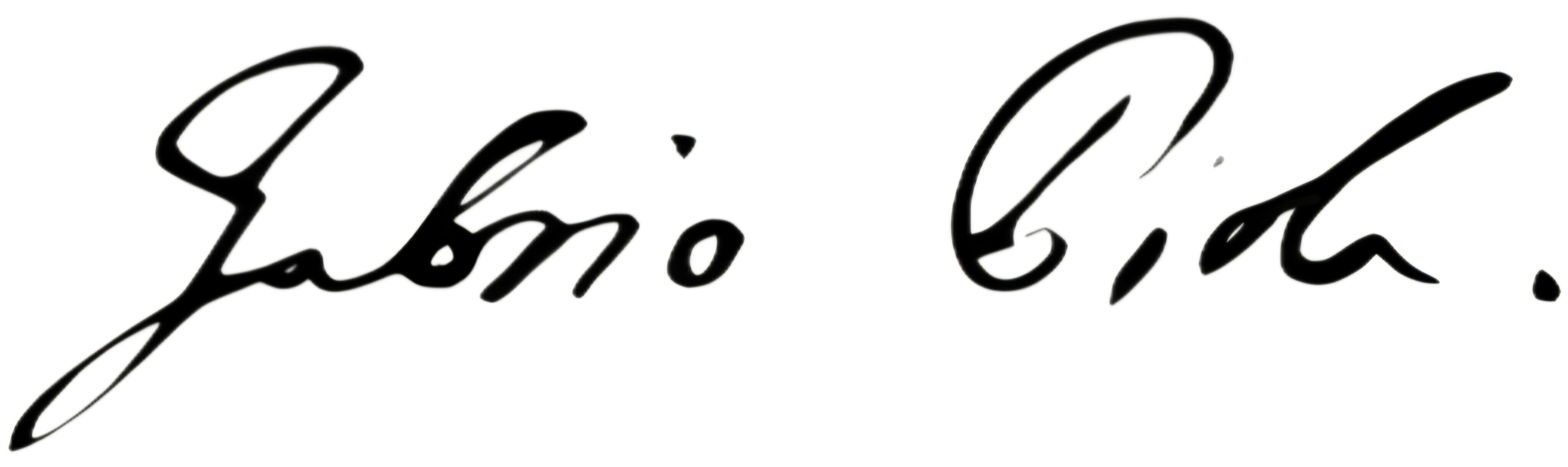

Gabrio Piola (15 July 1794 – 9 November 1850) was an Italian mathematician and physicist, member of the Lombard Institute of Science, Letters and Arts. He studied in particular continuum mechanics, linking his name to the tensors called Piola–Kirchhoff.

== Biography ==
Count Gabrio Piola Daverio was born in Milan in a rich and aristocratic family. Initially, he studied at home and then at the local high school. Given his exceptional ability in mathematics and physics, he started to study mathematics at the University of Pavia, as a student of Vincenzo Brunacci, obtaining his doctorate on 24 June 1816. He didn’t follow an academic career even though he was offered the chair of Applied Mathematics in Rome; he preferred dedicating himself to private teaching.

One of his students was Francesco Brioschi, who became Professor of rational mechanics at Pavia and President of the Academy of High Schools.

His research activity started in 1824, winning a competition and related prize at the Lombard Institute of Milan, with a long article on the mechanics of Lagrange. His mathematical research contributed to the calculation of finite differences and to integral calculus, whilst in mechanics he dedicated himself to continuum mechanics and to hydraulics.

Piola was also editor of a journal, mathematical and physics booklets of which only two volumes were published. However, this journal was the means of presenting the theories of Cauchy in Italy: in effect, the journal contained some of Cauchy’s fundamental works, translated from French into Italian.

Count Piola also dedicated himself to the study of history and philosophy. Throughout his life, he wrote historical and scientific accounts of Bonaventura Cavalieri.

He was a member of many scientific societies, amongst which the Italian Society of Science, and from 1825 he was part of the Roman Academy of the Catholic Religion. He was a fervent Catholic, as also was Cauchy. For the latter, Piola was a reference point for his stay in Italy from 1830 to 1833. He additionally taught religion for twenty-four years in a parish in Milan and was the friend of Antonio Rosmini, at that time the most important exponent of Catholic spirituality.

He was mainly involved in continuum mechanics, concerning fluids and solids. The Piola–Kirchhoff stress tensor and Piola transformation bear his name.

He died in Giussano, Brianza, on 9 November 1850, aged 56. Piazzale Piola and stazione Piola in Milan are named after him. The asteroid 39854 Gabriopiola discovered in 1998 bears his name.

== Writings ==
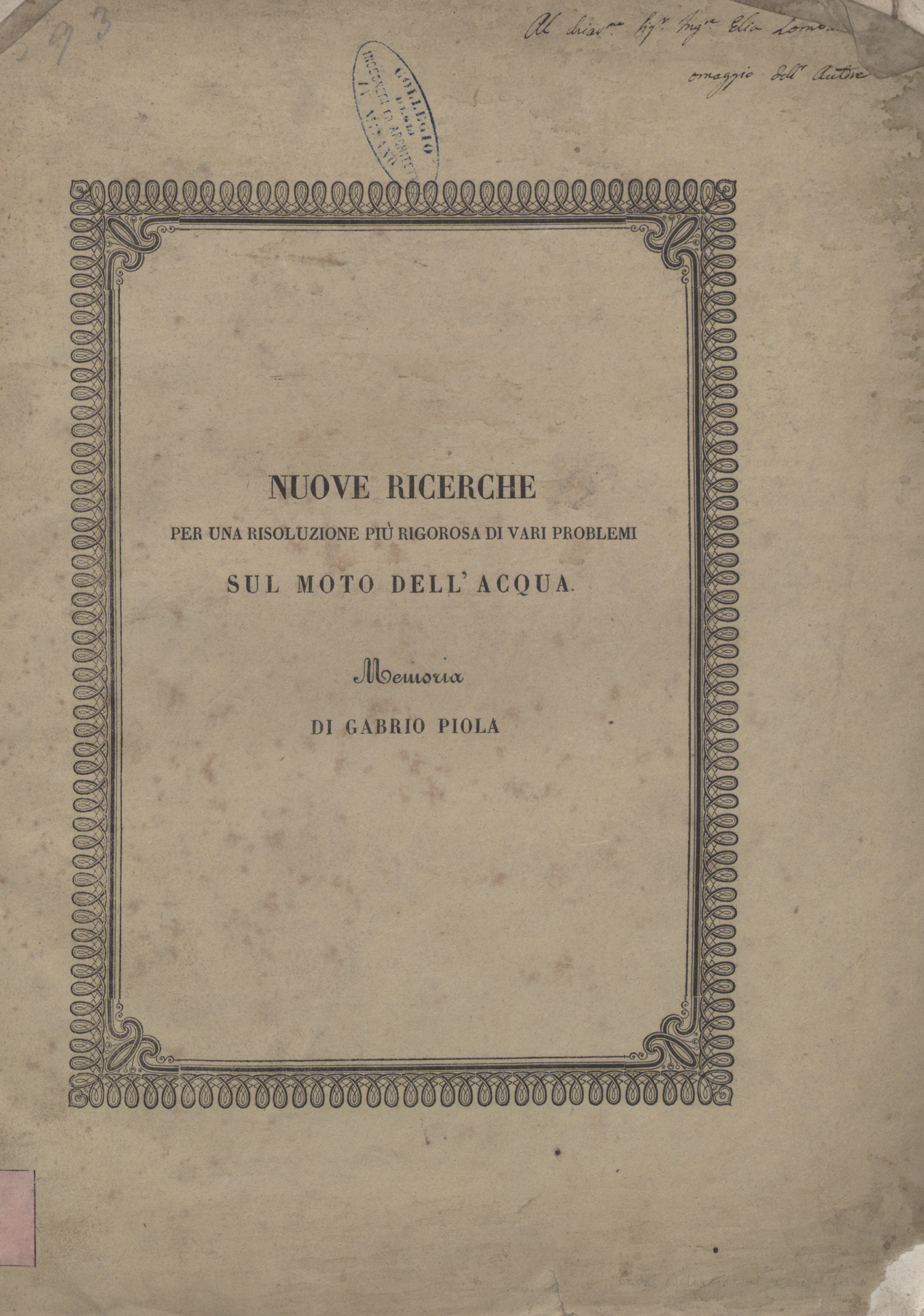
Nuove ricerche per una risoluzione più rigorosa di vari problemi sul moto dell'acqua (1843)

- Gabrio Piola, Sull'applicazione de' principj della meccanica analitica del Lagrange ai principali problemi. Memoria di Gabrio Piola presentata al concorso del premio e coronata dall'I.R. Istituto di Scienze, ecc. nella solennita del giorno 4 ottobre 1824, Milano, Imp. Regia stamperia, 1825
- Gabrio Piola, Sulla trasformazione delle formole integrali duplicate e triplicate, Modena, Tipografia Camerale, 1828
- Gabrio Piola, Sulla teorica delle funzioni discontinue, Modena, Tipografia Camerale, 1830
- Gabrio Piola, Memoria sulla Teorica del Pendolo, Milano, Imp. Reg. Stamperia, 1831
- Gabrio Piola, Memoria sull'applicazione del calcolo delle differenze alle questioni dell'analisi indeterminata, Padova, Tip. del Seminario, 1831
- Gabrio Piola, La meccanica de' corpi naturalmente estesi: trattata col calcolo delle variazioni, Milano, Giusti, 1833
- Gabrio Piola, Nuova analisi per tutte le questioni della meccanica molecolare, Modena, Tipografia camerale, 1835
- Gabrio Piola, Nuove ricerche per una risoluzione più rigorosa di vari problemi sul moto dell'acqua: memoria, Milano, Bernardoni, 1840
- Gabrio Piola, Trattato sul calcolo degli integrali definiti: parte 1, Milano: Giusti, 1839
- Gabrio Piola, Sulla legge della permanenza delle molecole de' fluidi in moto alle superficie libere, Milano, Bernardoni, 1843
- Gabrio Piola, Sul moto permanente dell'acqua, Milano, G. Bernardoni e C., 1845
- Gabrio Piola, Memoria intorno alle equazioni fondamentali del movimento di corpi qualsivogliono considerati secondo la naturale loro forma e costituzione, Modena, Tipi del R.D. Camera, 1846
- Gabrio Piola, Di un principio controverso della Meccanica analitica di Lagrange e delle molteplici sue applicazioni (memoria postuma pubblicata per cura del prof. Francesco Brioschi), Milano, Bernardoni, 1856

=== Writings on line ===
- Piola, Gabrio (1843). Nuove ricerche per una risoluzione più rigorosa di vari problemi sul moto dell'acqua. Milano: Tipografia di Giuseppe Bernardoni.

== Sources ==
- Capecchi, D. (2004). "Gabrio Piola e la Meccanica italiana agli inizi dell'Ottocento" (PDF). Atti del XXIII Congresso Nazionale di Storia della Fisica e dell'Astronomia - Bari 5-7 giugno 2003. Bari: Progedit. pp. 95–108. ISBN 88-88550-58-5. Archived from the original (PDF) on 10 October 2008.
- Filoni, A.; Giampaglia, A. (2006). Gabrio Piola 1794-1850 Biografia di un matematico umanista. Giussano: Bellavite.
- Capecchi, Danilo; Ruta, Giuseppe C. (2007). "Piola's contribution to continuum mechanics". Archive for History of Exact Sciences. 61 (4): 303–342. JSTOR 41134259.
- dell'Isola, F.; Maier, G.; Perego, U.; Andreaus, U.; Esposito, R.; Forest, S. (2014). The complete works of Gabrio Piola. Vol. I. Commented English Translation. Cham, Switzerland: Springer. doi:10.1007/978-3-319-00263-7.
- dell'Isola, F.; Andreaus, U.; Placidi, L. (2015). "At the origins and in the vanguard of peridynamics, non-local and higher-gradient continuum mechanics: An underestimated and still topical contribution of Gabrio Piola". Mathematics & Mechanics of Solids. 20: 887–928. arXiv:1310.5599. doi:10.1177/1081286513509811.
- dell’Isola, F.; Cazzani, A.; Andreaus, U.; Placidi, L.; Barchiesi, E. (2020). "Piola, Gabrio". In H. Altenbach; A. Öchsner (eds.). Encyclopedia of Continuum Mechanics. Berlin, Heidelberg: Springer. doi:10.1007/978-3-662-55771-6_51.
