= Delfino Codazzi =

Italian mathematician (1824–1873)

Delfino Codazzi (7 March 1824 in Lodi – 21 July 1873 in Pavia) was an Italian mathematician.

He made some important contributions to the differential geometry of surfaces, such as the Codazzi–Mainardi equations.

== Biography ==
He graduated in mathematics at the University of Pavia, where he was a pupil of Antonio Bordoni. For a long period Codazzi taught first at the Ginnasio Liceale of Lodi, then at the liceo of Pavia. Meanwhile, he devoted himself to research in differential geometry.

In 1865, he was appointed professor of complementary algebra and analytic geometry at University of Pavia. He remained in his position at Pavia until his death in 1873.

He also obtained results concerning isometric lines, geodesic triangles, equiareal mapping and the stability of floating bodies.

== See also ==
- Gauss–Codazzi equations
- Codazzi tensor
