= Piola–Kirchhoff stress tensors =

Stress case in finite deformations

In the case of finite deformations, the Piola–Kirchhoff stress tensors (named for Gabrio Piola and Gustav Kirchhoff) express the stress relative to the reference configuration. This is in contrast to the Cauchy stress tensor which expresses the stress relative to the present configuration. For infinitesimal deformations and rotations, the Cauchy and Piola–Kirchhoff tensors are identical. Whereas the Cauchy stress tensor $\boldsymbol{\sigma}$ relates stresses in the current configuration, the deformation gradient and strain tensors are described by relating the motion to the reference configuration; thus not all tensors describing the state of the material are in either the reference or current configuration. Describing the stress, strain and deformation either in the reference or current configuration would make it easier to define constitutive models (for example, the Cauchy Stress tensor is variant to a pure rotation, while the deformation strain tensor is invariant; thus creating problems in defining a constitutive model that relates a varying tensor, in terms of an invariant one during pure rotation; as by definition constitutive models have to be invariant to pure rotations). The 1st Piola–Kirchhoff stress tensor, $\boldsymbol{P}$ is one possible solution to this problem. It defines a family of tensors, which describe the configuration of the body in either the current or the reference state.

The first Piola–Kirchhoff stress tensor, $\boldsymbol{P}$, relates forces in the present ("spatial") configuration with areas in the reference ("material") configuration.

$$\boldsymbol{P} = J~\boldsymbol{\sigma}~\boldsymbol{F}^{-T} ~$$

where $\boldsymbol{F}$ is the deformation gradient and $J= \det\boldsymbol{F}$ is the Jacobian determinant. In terms of components with respect to an orthonormal basis, the first Piola–Kirchhoff stress is given by

$$P_{iL} = J~\sigma_{ik}~F^{-1}_{Lk} = J~\sigma_{ik}~\cfrac{\partial X_L}{\partial x_k}~\,\!$$

Because it relates different coordinate systems, the first Piola–Kirchhoff stress is a two-point tensor. In general, it is not symmetric. The first Piola–Kirchhoff stress is the 3D generalization of the 1D concept of engineering stress. If the material rotates without a change in stress state (rigid rotation), the components of the first Piola–Kirchhoff stress tensor will vary with material orientation. The first Piola–Kirchhoff stress is energy conjugate to the deformation gradient. It relates forces in the current configuration to areas in the reference configuration.

The second Piola–Kirchhoff stress tensor, $\boldsymbol{S}$, relates forces in the reference configuration to areas in the reference configuration. The force in the reference configuration is obtained via a mapping that preserves the relative relationship between the force direction and the area normal in the reference configuration.

$$\boldsymbol{S} = J~\boldsymbol{F}^{-1}\cdot\boldsymbol{\sigma}\cdot\boldsymbol{F}^{-T} ~.$$

In index notation with respect to an orthonormal basis,

$$S_{IL}=J~F^{-1}_{Ik}~F^{-1}_{Lm}~\sigma_{km} = J~\cfrac{\partial X_I}{\partial x_k}~\cfrac{\partial X_L}{\partial x_m}~\sigma_{km} \!\,\!$$

This tensor, a one-point tensor, is symmetric. If the material rotates without a change in stress state (rigid rotation), the components of the second Piola–Kirchhoff stress tensor remain constant, irrespective of material orientation. The second Piola–Kirchhoff stress tensor is energy conjugate to the Green–Lagrange finite strain tensor.
