= Gregorio Fontana =

Italian mathematician (1735–1803)

Gregorio Fontana FRS
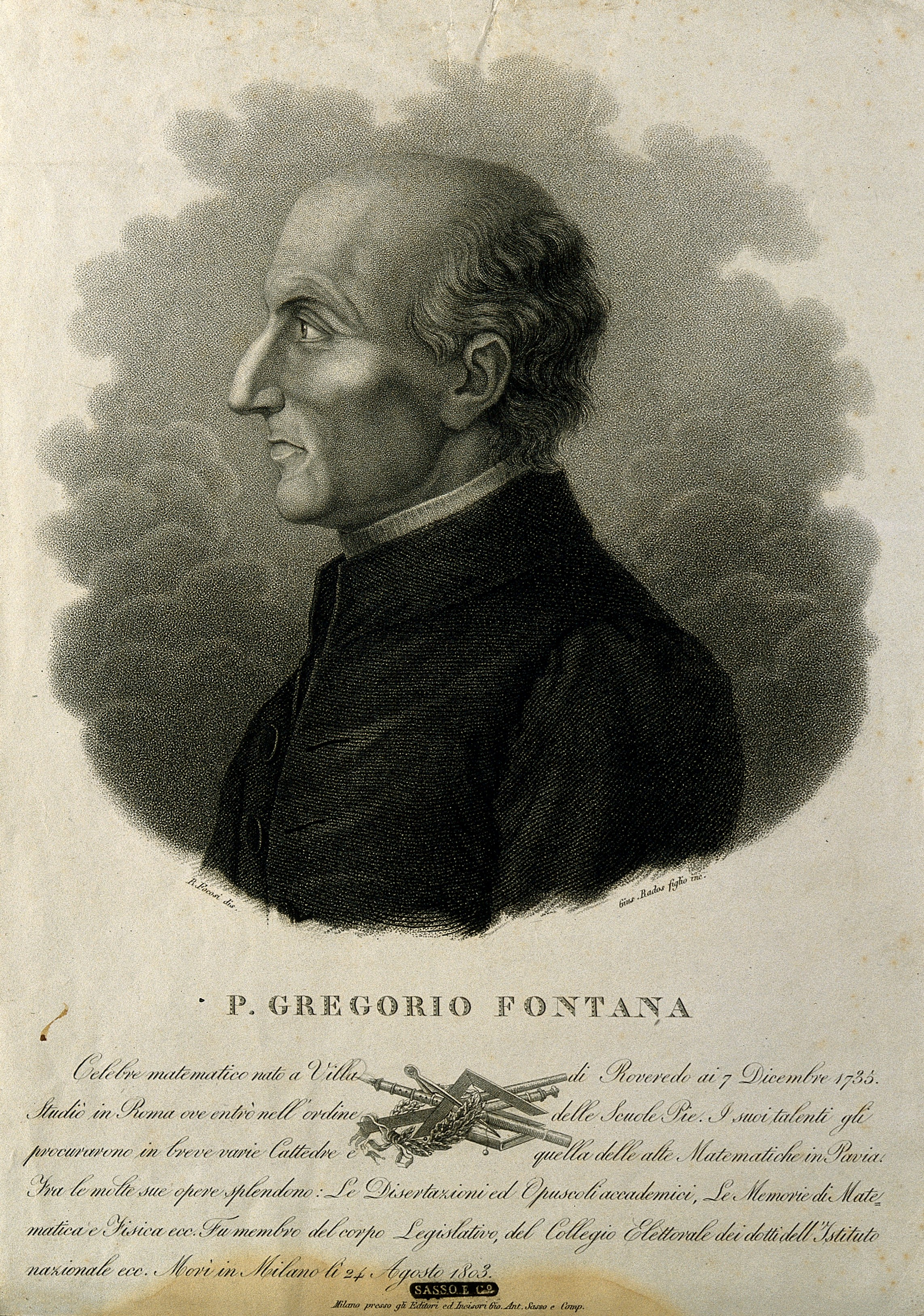
- Born: Giovanni Battista Lorenzo Fontana; 7 December 1735; Nogaredo, Italy
- Died: 24 August 1803 (aged 67); Milan, Italy
- Known for: polar coordinates
- Scientific career
- Fields: Geometry
- Workplaces: University of Pavia
- Notable students: Pietro Paoli

Gregorio Fontana, born Giovanni Battista Lorenzo Fontana (7 December 1735 – 24 August 1803) was an Italian mathematician and a religious of the Piarist order. He was chair of mathematics at the university of Pavia, succeeding Roger Joseph Boscovich. He has been credited with the introduction of polar coordinates. Though an abbot, he was sympathetic to the ideals of the French Revolution.

== Biography ==
Gregorio Fontana was born in Nogaredo, Trento, on 7 December 1735. His brother was the physicist Felice Fontana.

A close friend of Giulio Carlo de' Toschi di Fagnano, he succeeded Boscovich in the chair of mathematics at the University of Pavia. He was also entrusted with the position of curator of the university library. Fontana played a pivotal role in the systematic introduction in Italy of the study of Leonhard Euler's treatises on mathematical analysis. In 1795 he was elected a fellow of the Royal Society.

After the outbreak of the French Revolution, Fontana developed radical political attitudes. He was actively involved in the Cisalpine Republic as a politician and legislator.

== Work ==
Fontana was a good mathematician, concerned with hydraulics, hydrodynamics, astronomy, optics, mechanics, probability, analysis (series, logarithms of negative numbers, difference equations) and iatromechanics.

Fontana was a pioneer in the study of the history of mathematics. Apart from an essay on the mathematical progress achieved by Gerolamo Cardano and Bonaventura Cavalieri, his writings on the history of mathematics were published at the end of the fourth tome of the first Italian edition of Charles Bossut's Essai sur l'histoire générale des mathématiques, which was translated by Andrea Mozzoni, a professor of mathematics at the Liceo of Bergamo and translator of other works by Bossut, and edited by Fontana himself. This Italian translation of Bossut's work is considered even more interesting than the French edition, thanks to Fontana's notes and additions.

It includes presentation of Bossut's major work and 18 appendices in which Fontana develops some limited questions or themes of the history of mathematics and gives full details and more recent contributions, with mathematical insight and competence and with an accurate historical investigation. These arguments are also connected with Fontana's own mathematical research. Precisely because of their different style and perspective, the appendices round out Bossut's general work very well.

Topics dealt with by Fontana include Archimedes' Sphere and Cylinder and the recent contributions of Francesco Maria Zanotti; Hippocrates' quadrature of lunes in which he analyses some ancient Greek codices; the various instruments for the measurement of longitude; the tautochrones and the Lagrange-Fontaine dispute; Herschel's telescope; iatromechanics; various questions on optics and dioptrics; the tides; the naval architecture of the ancient Romans.

== Works ==
- Analyseos sublimioris opuscula (in Latin). 1763.
- Delle altezze barometriche e di alcuni insigni paradossi relativi alle medesime. Bolzani, Giuseppe. 1771.
- Dissertazione idrodinamica. 1775.
- Disquisitiones physico-mathematicae (in Latin). 1780.
- Dissertazione sul computo dell'errore probabile nelle sperienze ed osservazioni. 1781.
- Ricerche sopra diversi punti concernenti l'analisi infinitesimale e la sua applicazione alla fisica. Comino, Baldassare. 1793.
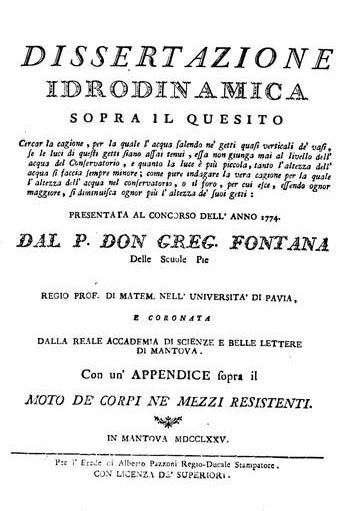
Dissertazione idrodinamica, 1775

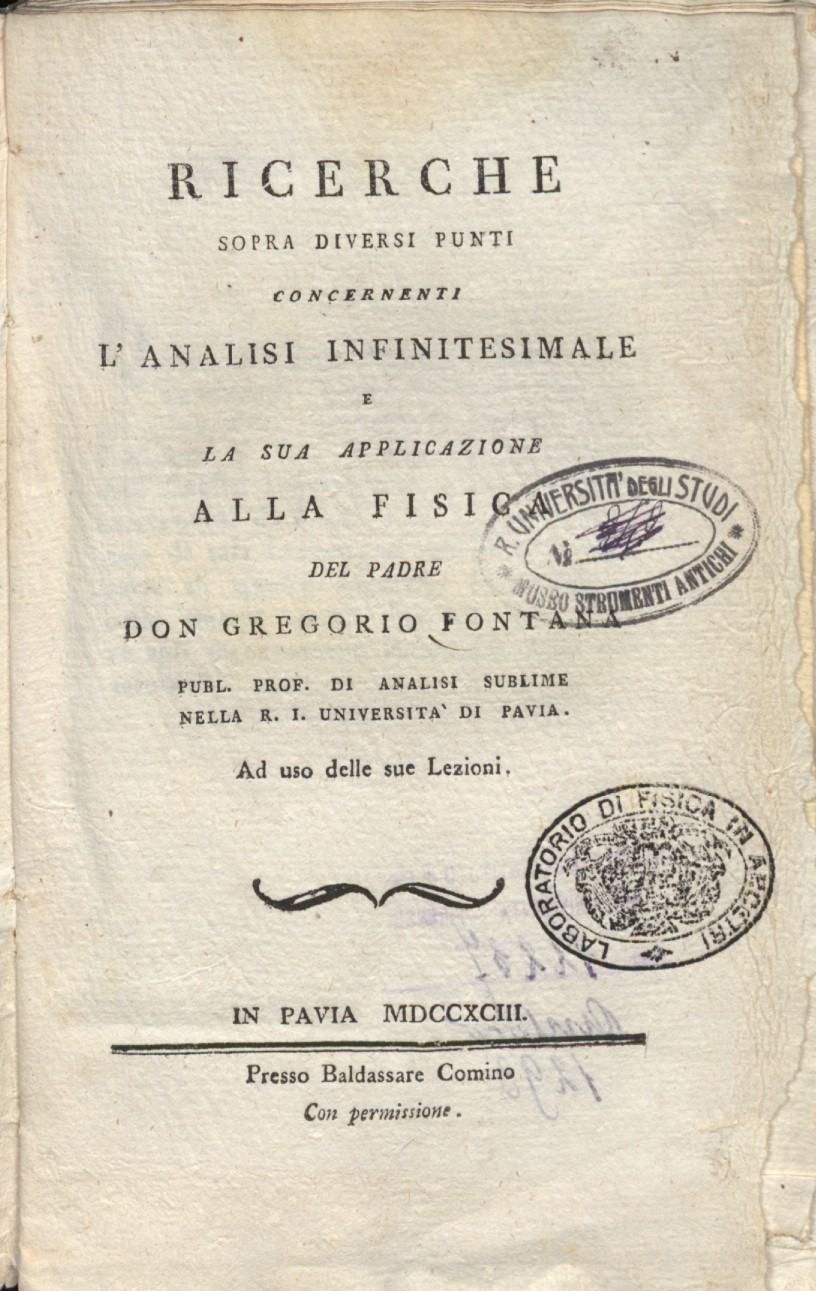
Ricerche sopra diversi punti concernenti l'analisi infinitesimale e la sua applicazione alla fisica, 1793
