= Felice Casorati (mathematician) =

Italian mathematician (1835–1890)

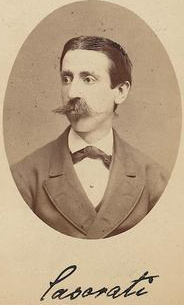
- Felice Casorati
- Born: 17 December 1835; Pavia, Lombardy–Venetia
- Died: 11 September 1890 (aged 54); Casteggio, Italy
- Education: University of Pavia
- Scientific career
- Fields: Mathematician
- Doctoral advisor: Francesco Brioschi

Felice Casorati (17 December 1835 – 11 September 1890) was an Italian mathematician who studied at the University of Pavia. He was born in Pavia and died in Casteggio.

He is best known for the Casorati–Weierstrass theorem in complex analysis. The theorem, named for Casorati and Karl Theodor Wilhelm Weierstrass, describes the remarkable behaviour of holomorphic functions near essential singularities, which is that every holomorphic function gets values from any complex neighbourhood, in any neighbourhood of the singularity.

The Casorati matrix is useful in the study of linear difference equations, just as the Wronskian is useful with linear differential equations. It is calculated based on n functions of the single input variable.

== Works ==
- Casorati, Felice (1868), Teorica delle funzioni di variabili complesse (in Italian), Pavia: Tipografia dei Fratelli Fusi, pp. XXX+471, JFM 01.0128.05, available at Gallica (also at GDZ). Freely available copies of volume 1 of his best-known monograph, the only one ever published.
- Le proprietà cardinali degli strumenti ottici anche non centrati (in Italian). Milano: Bernardoni. 1872.
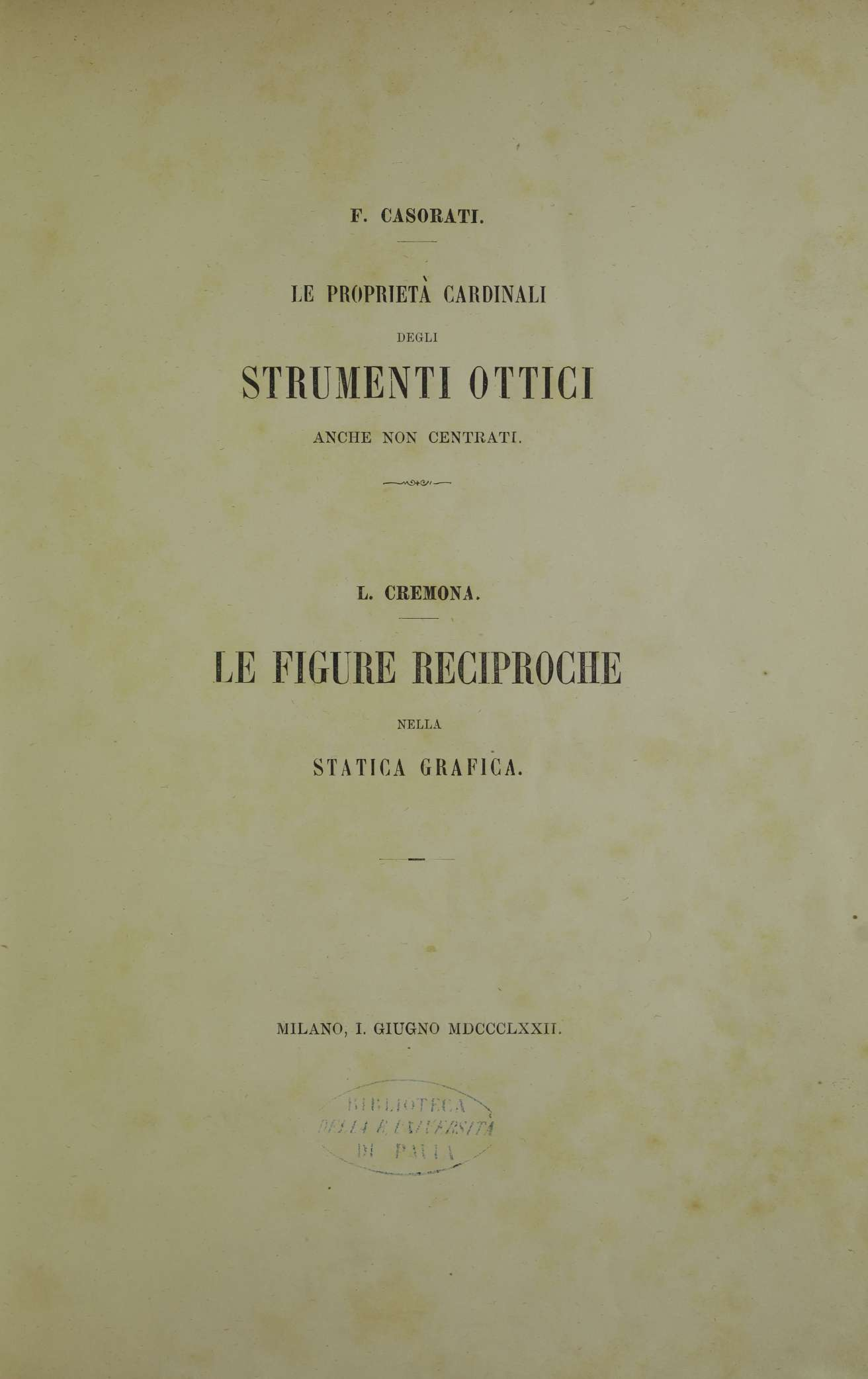
Le proprietà cardinali degli strumenti ottici anche non centrati, 1872
