= Francesco Brioschi =

Italian mathematician (1824–1897)

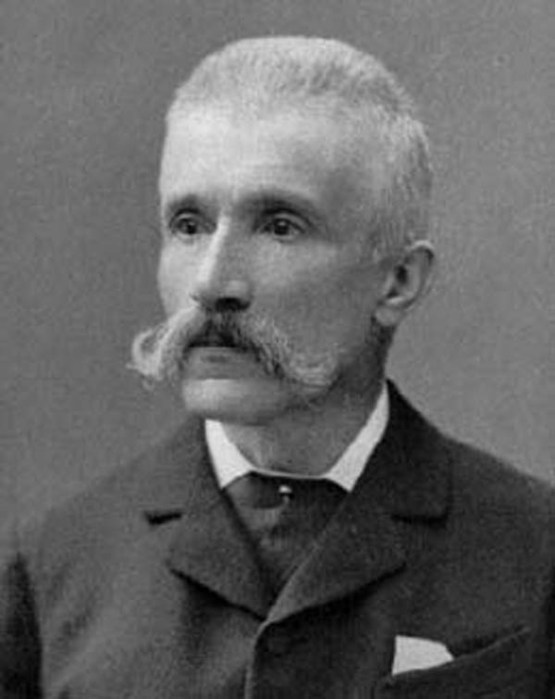
- Born: 22 December 1824; Milan, Kingdom of Lombardy–Venetia
- Died: 13 December 1897 (aged 72); Milan, Kingdom of Italy
- Education: Collegio Borromeo
- Known for: Brioschi formula Brioschi normal form Hermite–Kronecker–Brioschi characterization Treewidth
- Scientific career
- Fields: Mathematics
- Workplaces: University of Pavia
- Doctoral advisor: Antonio Bordoni
- Doctoral students: Felice Casorati; Luigi Cremona
- Other notable students: Eugenio Beltrami

President of the Accademia nazionale delle scienze
- In office 1 August 1868 – 28 January 1875
- Preceded by: Carlo Matteucci
- Succeeded by: Arcangelo Scacchi

Francesco Brioschi (22 December 1824 – 13 December 1897) was an Italian mathematician who contributed to the study of mathematical physics.

== Biography ==
Brioschi was born in Milan in 1824. He graduated from the Collegio Borromeo in 1847.

From 1850 he taught analytical mechanics at the University of Pavia. After the Italian unification in 1861, he was elected to the Chamber of Deputies and then appointed twice secretary of the Italian Education Ministry. In 1863 he founded the Polytechnic University of Milan, where he worked until his death, lecturing in hydraulics, analytical mechanics and construction engineering. In 1865 he entered the Senate of the Kingdom. In 1870 he became a member of the Accademia dei lincei and in 1884 he succeeded Quintino Sella as president of the National Academy of the Lincei. He directed the Il Politecnico (The Polytechnic) review and, between 1867 and 1877, the Annali di Matematica Pura ed Applicata (Annals of pure and applied mathematics). He was awarded honorary membership of the Manchester Literary and Philosophical Society in 1892, dying in Milan in 1897.

As a mathematician, Brioschi published in Italy various algebraic theories and studied the problem of solving fifth and sixth-degree equations using elliptic functions. Brioschi is also remembered as a distinguished teacher: among his students at the University of Pavia, there were Eugenio Beltrami, Luigi Cremona and Felice Casorati.

== Works ==
- Intorno ad alcuni punti della statica (in Italian). Pavia: eredi Bizzoni. 1853.
- Théorie des déterminants et leurs principales applications (Mallet-Bachelier, Paris, 1856) (French translation of "La teorica dei determinanti e le sue principali applicazioni" by E. Combescure)
- Sopra un progetto di inchiesta idrometrica. [Milano]: [Tip. di Zanetti Francesco]. 1867.
- Delle traverse oblique alla direzione di un corso d'acqua. Milano: Amministrazione del Politecnico. 1866.
- Opere matematiche di Francesco Brioschi. Pubblicate per cura del comitato per le onoranze a Francesco Brioschi (G. Ascoli, E. Beltrami, G. Colombo, L. Cremona, G. Negri, G. Schiaparelli), vol. 1 (U. Hoepli, Milano, 1901–1909)
- Opere matematiche di Francesco Brioschi pubblicate per cura del Comitato per le onoranze a Francesco Brioschi... (vols. 1-5) (U. Hoepli, Milano, 1901–1909)
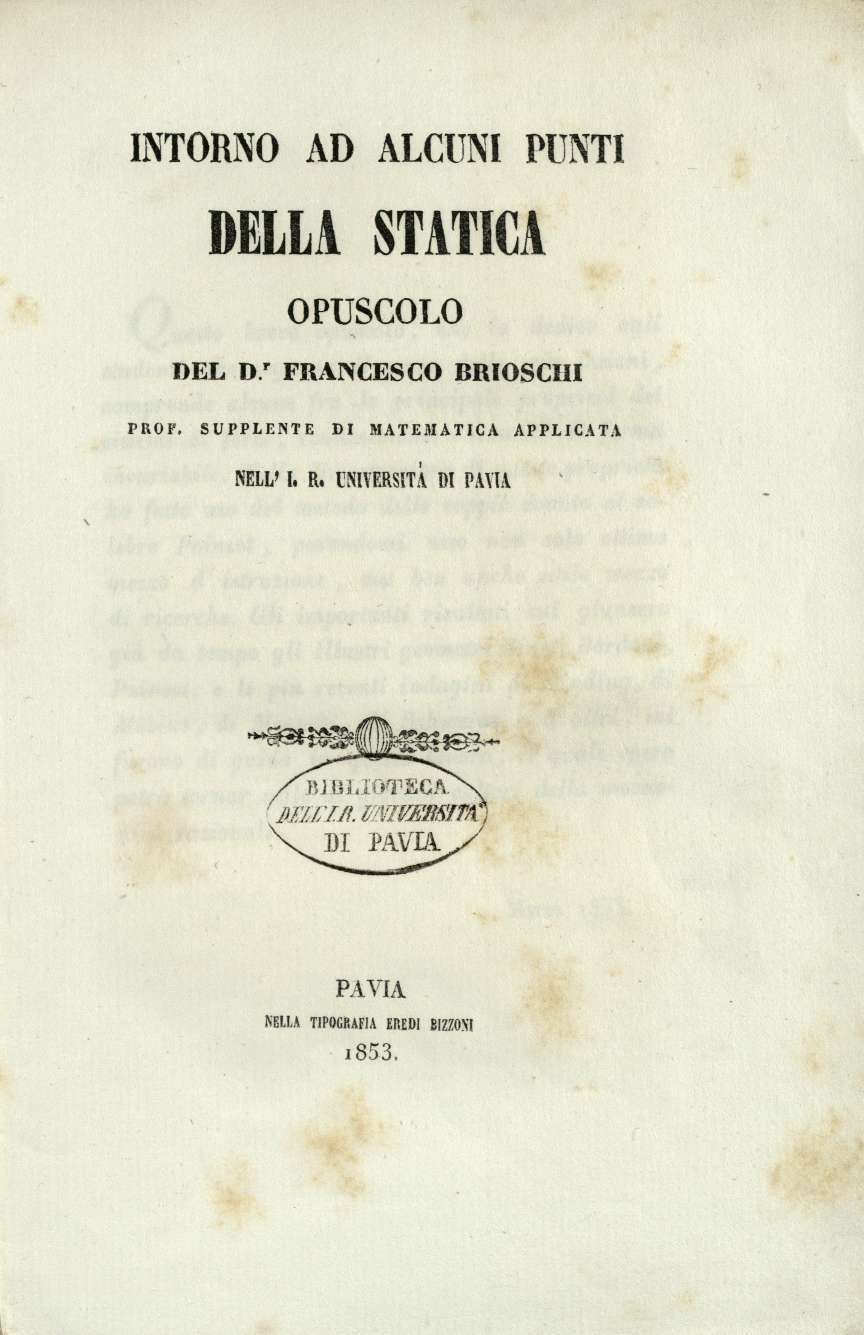
Intorno ad alcuni punti della statica, 1853

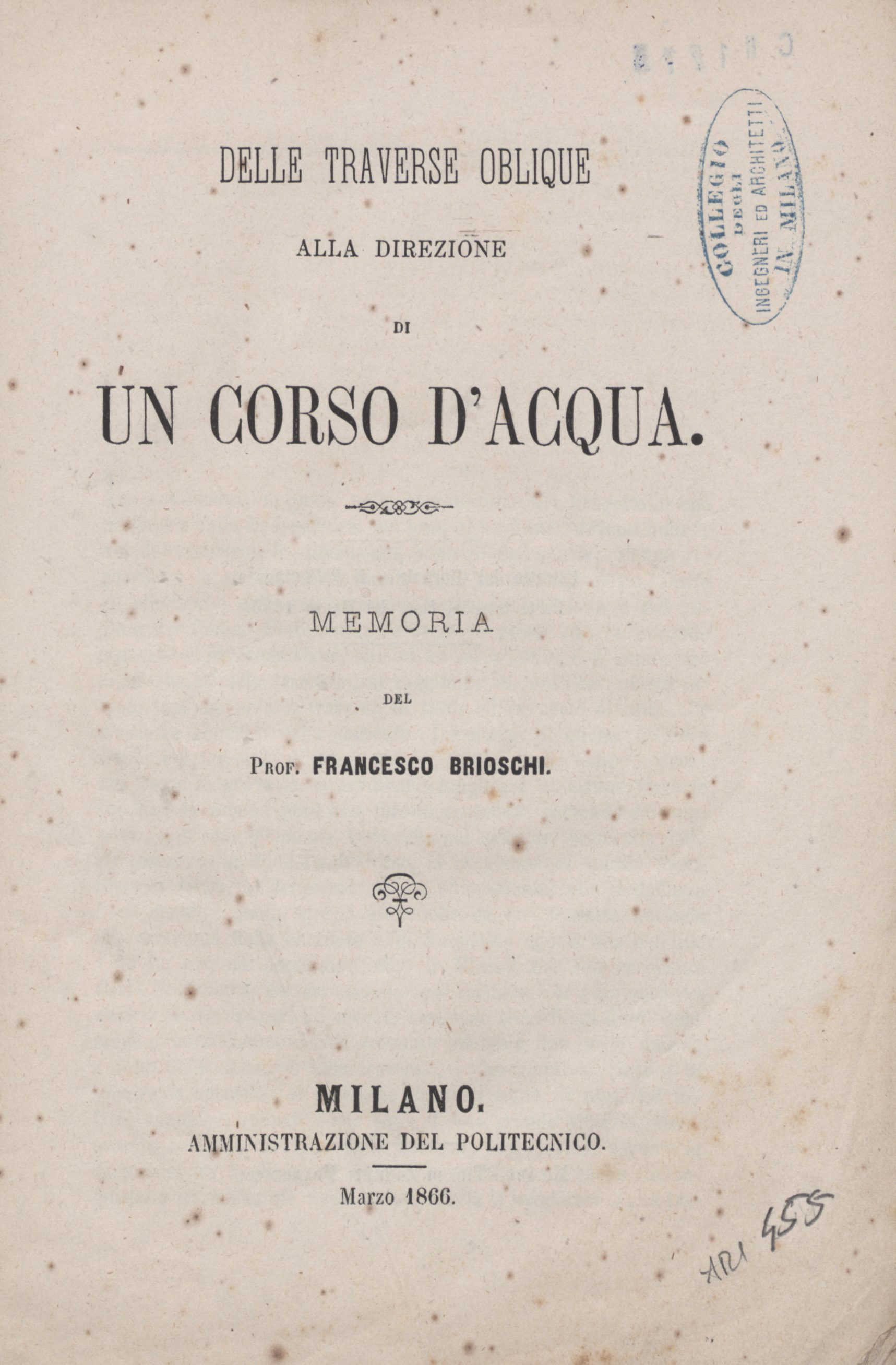
Delle traverse oblique alla direzione di un corso d'acqua, 1866

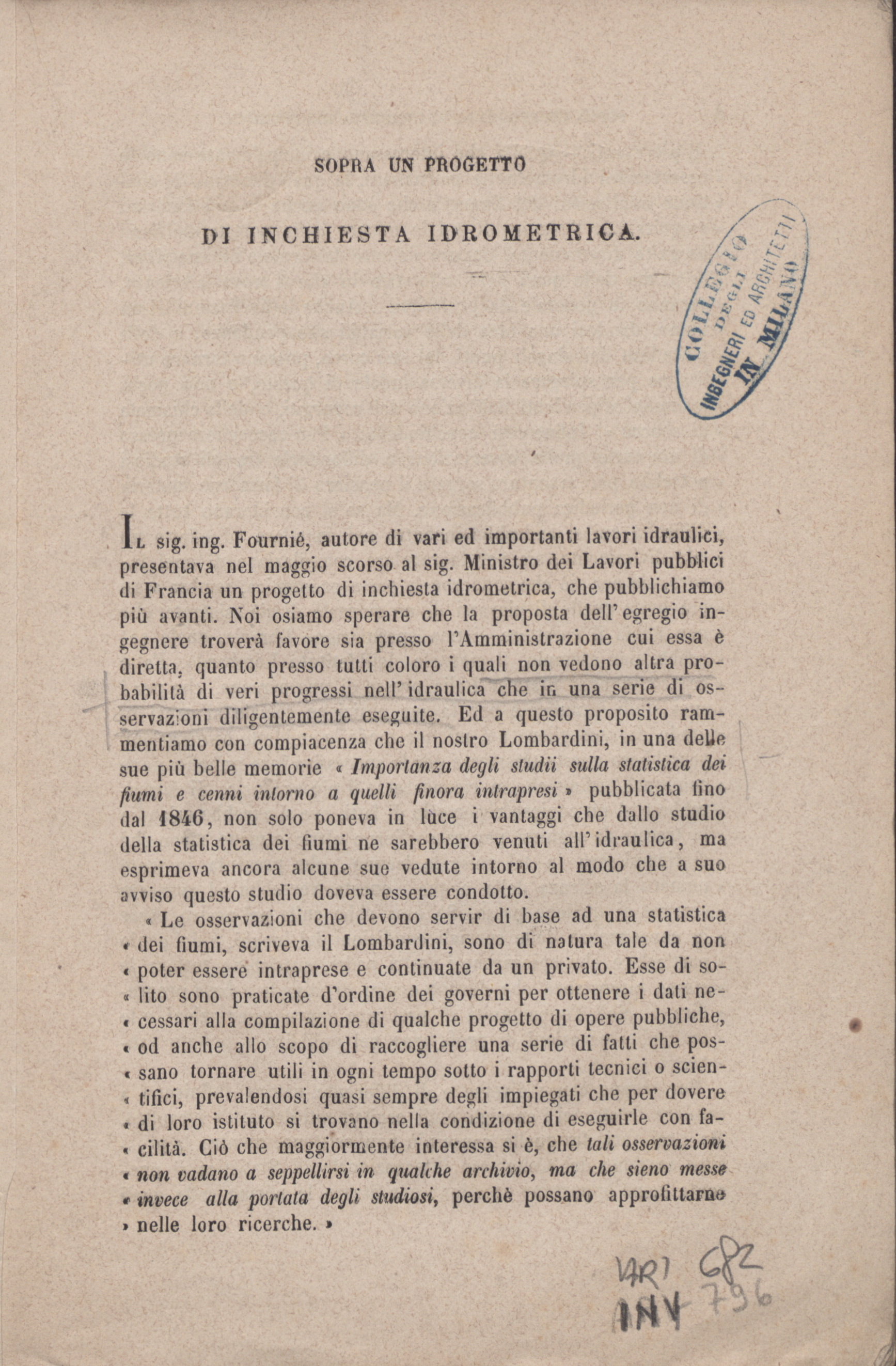
Sopra un progetto di inchiesta idrometrica, 1867

== See also ==
- Brioschi formula
- Brioschi quintic form
- Politecnico di Milano
