= Luigi Cremona =

Italian mathematician (1830–1903)

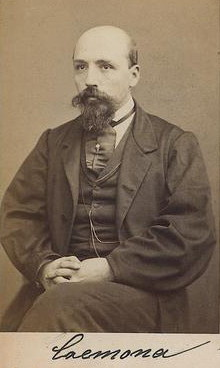
- Born: Antonio Luigi Gaudenzio Giuseppe Cremona; 7 December 1830; Pavia, Lombardy, Kingdom of Lombardy–Venetia, Austrian Empire
- Died: 10 June 1903 (aged 72); Rome, Kingdom of Italy
- Education: University of Pavia
- Known for: Algebraic curve
- Scientific career
- Fields: Mathematics
- Workplaces: University of Rome
- Doctoral advisor: Francesco Brioschi
- Doctoral students: Giuseppe Veronese

President of the Accademia nazionale delle scienze
- In office 20 April 1893 – 18 May 1903
- Preceded by: Arcangelo Scacchi
- Succeeded by: Stanislao Cannizzaro

Antonio Luigi Gaudenzio Giuseppe Cremona (7 December 1830 – 10 June 1903) was an Italian mathematician. His life was devoted to the study of geometry and reforming advanced mathematical teaching in Italy. He worked on algebraic curves and algebraic surfaces, particularly through his paper Introduzione ad una teoria geometrica delle curve piane ("Introduction to a geometrical theory of the plane curves"), and was a founder of the Italian school of algebraic geometry.

== Biography ==
Oldest son of Gaudenzio Cremona and Teresa Andreoli, Luigi Cremona was born in Pavia (Lombardy), then part of the Austrian-controlled Kingdom of Lombardy–Venetia. His youngest brother, only surviving sibling other than Luigi after Pietro and Francesca passed, was the painter Tranquillo Cremona.

In 1848, when Milan and Venice rose against Austria, Cremona, then only seventeen, joined the ranks of the Italian volunteers. He remained with them, fighting on behalf of his country's freedom, until, in 1849, the capitulation of Venice put an end to the campaign.

He then returned to Pavia, where he pursued his studies at the university under Francesco Brioschi, and determined to seek a career as teacher of mathematics. He graduated in 1853 as dottore negli studi di ingegnere civile e architetto.

Cremona is noted for the important role he played in bringing about the great geometrical advances in Italy. While, at the beginning of the nineteenth century, Italy had very little mathematical standing, the end of the century found Italy in the lead along geometric lines, largely as a result of the work of Cremona. He was very influential in bringing about reforms in the secondary schools of Italy and became a leader in questions of mathematical pedagogy as well as in those relating to the advancement of knowledge. The mathematical advances which Italy made since the middle of the nineteenth century were largely guided by Cremona, Brioschi, and Beltrami.

His first appointment was as elementary mathematical master at the gymnasium and lyceum of Cremona, and he afterwards obtained a similar post at Milan. In 1860 he was appointed to the professorship of higher geometry at the University of Bologna, and in 1866 to that of higher geometry and graphical statics at the higher technical college of Milan. In this same year he competed for the Steiner Prize of the Berlin Academy, with a treatise entitled Memoria sulle superfici del terzo ordine, and shared the award with J. C. F. Sturm. Two years later the same prize was conferred on him without competition.

As early as 1856 Cremona had begun to contribute to the Annali di scienze matematiche e fisiche, and to the Annali di matematica, of which he became afterwards joint editor. Papers by him appeared in the mathematical journals of Italy, France, Germany and England, and he published several important works, many of which have been translated into other languages. His manual Graphical Statics and his Elements of Projective Geometry (translated by Thomas Hudson Beare and C. Leudesdorf respectively) were published in English by the Clarendon Press.

In 1873 he was called to Rome to organize the Royal College of Engineering, and was also appointed professor of higher mathematics at the university. Cremona's reputation had now become European, and in 1879 he was elected a corresponding member of the Royal Society. In the same year he became a member of the senate of the Kingdom of Italy. In 1898 he was briefly minister for education. The Royal Swedish Academy of Sciences elected Cremona as member in 1901. The following year, he was awarded the German Pour le Mérite for Sciences and Arts.

He died in Rome in 1903. Cremona on the Moon was named after him in 1964.

== Works ==
- Elementi di calcolo grafico: ad uso degli Istituti Tecnici (Stamperia reale di G. B. Paravia e C., Torino, 1874)
- Elementi di geometria projettiva (G. B. Paravia e Comp., Torino, 1873)
- Introduzione ad una teoria geometrica delle curve piane (Tipi Gamberini e Parmeggiani, Bologna, 1862)
- Le figure reciproche nella statica grafica (Tipografia di G. Bernardoni, Milano, 1872)
- Opere matematiche di Luigi Cremona; pubblicati sotto gli auspici della R. Accademia dei Lincei (U. Hoepli, Milano, 1914)
- Preliminari di una teoria geometrica delle superficie (Tipi Gamberini e Parmeggiani, Bologna, 1866)
- Elements of projective geometry (Clarendon press, Oxford, 1885) (translation by Charles Leudesdorf)
- Graphical statics. Two treatises on the graphical calculus and reciprocal figures in graphical statics (Clarendon press, Oxford, 1890) (Translated by Thomas Hudson Beare.)

== See also ==
- Cardioid
- Cremona diagram
- Cremona group
- Cremona–Richmond configuration
- Maxwell–Cremona correspondence
- Truss

== Sources ==
- Dolgachev, Igor V. (2005), "Luigi Cremona and cubic surfaces" (PDF), Luigi Cremona (1830–1903), Incontro di Studio, vol. 36, Istituto Lombardo di Scienze e Lettere, Milan, pp. 55–70, MR 2305952
- Chisholm, Hugh, ed. (1911). "Cremona, Luigi" . Encyclopædia Britannica (11th ed.). Cambridge University Press.
- G. B. Mathews (1917) Opere Matematiche di Luigi Cremona Nature 100:23 (#2498).
- O'Connor, John J.; Robertson, Edmund F., "Luigi Cremona", MacTutor History of Mathematics Archive, University of St Andrews
- Luigi Cremona at the Mathematics Genealogy Project
- Tricomi: La Matematica Italiana 1800–1950 (entry on Cremona)
- De Gubernatis, Angelo (1879). Dizionario biografico degli scrittori contemporanei diretto da Angelo De Gubernatis (in Italian). Successori Le Monnier. p. 325.
