= Eugenio Beltrami =

Italian mathematician (1835–1900)

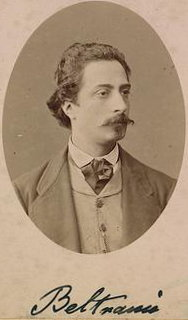
- Eugenio Beltrami
- Born: 16 November 1835; Cremona, Lombardy, Kingdom of Lombardy–Venetia, Austrian Empire
- Died: 18 February 1900 (aged 64); Rome, Kingdom of Italy
- Education: Ghislieri College, Pavia (no degree)
- Known for: Beltrami equation Beltrami identity Beltrami's theorem Laplace–Beltrami operator Beltrami vector field Beltrami flow Beltrami–Klein model Beltrami stress tensor Beltrami–Michell compatibility equations
- Scientific career
- Fields: Mathematician
- Workplaces: University of Bologna; University of Pisa; University of Rome; University of Pavia
- Academic advisors: Francesco Brioschi
- Doctoral students: Giovanni Frattini

Eugenio Beltrami (16 November 1835 – 18 February 1900) was an Italian mathematician notable for his work concerning differential geometry and mathematical physics. His work was noted especially for clarity of exposition. He was the first to prove the consistency of non-Euclidean geometry by modelling it on a surface of constant curvature, the pseudosphere, and in the interior of an n-dimensional unit sphere, the so-called Beltrami–Klein model. He also developed singular value decomposition for matrices, which has been subsequently rediscovered several times. Beltrami's use of differential calculus for problems of mathematical physics indirectly influenced the development of tensor calculus by Gregorio Ricci-Curbastro and Tullio Levi-Civita.

== Life ==
Beltrami was born in 1835 in Cremona (Lombardy), then a part of the Austrian Empire, and now part of Italy. Both parents were artists, Giovanni Beltrami and the Venetian Elisa Barozzi. He began studying mathematics at University of Pavia in 1853, but was expelled from Ghislieri College in 1856 due to his political opinions—he was sympathetic with the Risorgimento. During this time, he was taught and influenced by Francesco Brioschi. He had to discontinue his studies because of financial hardship and spent the next several years as a secretary working for the Lombardy–Venice railroad company. He was appointed to the University of Bologna as a professor in 1862, the year he published his first research paper. Throughout his life, Beltrami had various professorial positions at the universities of Pisa, Rome and Pavia. From 1891 until the end of his life, Beltrami lived in Rome. He became the president of the Accademia dei Lincei in 1898 and a senator of the Kingdom of Italy in 1899.

== Contributions to non-Euclidean geometry ==
In 1868, Beltrami published two memoirs (written in Italian; French translations by J. Hoüel appeared in 1869) dealing with consistency and interpretations of non-Euclidean geometry of János Bolyai and Nikolai Lobachevsky. In his "Essay on an interpretation of non-Euclidean geometry", Beltrami proposed that this geometry could be realised on a surface of constant negative curvature, a pseudosphere. For Beltrami's concept, lines of the geometry are represented by geodesics on the pseudosphere and theorems of non-Euclidean geometry can be proved within ordinary three-dimensional Euclidean space, and not derived in an axiomatic fashion, as Lobachevsky and Bolyai had done previously. In 1840, Ferdinand Minding already considered geodesic triangles on the pseudosphere and remarked that the corresponding "trigonometric formulas" are obtained from the corresponding formulas of spherical trigonometry by replacing the usual trigonometric functions with hyperbolic functions; this was further developed by Delfino Codazzi in 1857, but apparently neither of them noticed the association with Lobachevsky's work. In this way, Beltrami attempted to demonstrate that two-dimensional non-Euclidean geometry is as valid as the Euclidean geometry of the space, and in particular, that Euclid's parallel postulate could not be derived from the other axioms of Euclidean geometry. It is often stated that this proof was incomplete due to the singularities of the pseudosphere, which means that geodesics could not be extended indefinitely. However, John Stillwell remarks that Beltrami must have been well aware of this difficulty, which is also manifested by the fact that the pseudosphere is topologically a cylinder, and not a plane, and he spent a part of his memoir designing a way around it. By a suitable choice of coordinates, Beltrami showed how the metric on the pseudosphere can be transferred to the unit disk and that the singularity of the pseudosphere corresponds to a horocycle on the non-Euclidean plane. On the other hand, in the introduction to his memoir, Beltrami states that it would be impossible to justify "the rest of Lobachevsky's theory", i.e., the non-Euclidean geometry of space, by this method.

In the second memoir published during the same year (1868), "Fundamental theory of spaces of constant curvature", Beltrami continued this logic and gave an abstract proof of equiconsistency of hyperbolic and Euclidean geometry for any dimension. He accomplished this by introducing several models of non-Euclidean geometry that are now known as the Beltrami–Klein model, the Poincaré disk model, and the Poincaré half-plane model, together with transformations that relate them. For the half-plane model, Beltrami cited a note by Joseph Liouville in the treatise of Gaspard Monge on differential geometry. Beltrami also showed that n-dimensional Euclidean geometry is realised on a horosphere of the (n + 1)-dimensional hyperbolic space, so the logical relation between consistency of the Euclidean and the non-Euclidean geometries is symmetric. Beltrami acknowledged the influence of Bernhard Riemann's groundbreaking Habilitation lecture "On the hypotheses on which geometry is based" (1854; published posthumously in 1868).

Although today Beltrami's "Essay" is recognised as very important for the development of non-Euclidean geometry, the reception at the time was less enthusiastic. Luigi Cremona objected to perceived circular reasoning, which even forced Beltrami to delay the publication of the "Essay" by one year. Subsequently, Felix Klein failed to acknowledge Beltrami's priority in the construction of the projective disk model of non-Euclidean geometry. This reaction can be attributed in part to the novelty of Beltrami's reasoning, which was similar to the ideas of Riemann concerning abstract manifolds. J. Hoüel published Beltrami's proof in his French translation of the works of Lobachevsky and Bolyai.

== Works ==
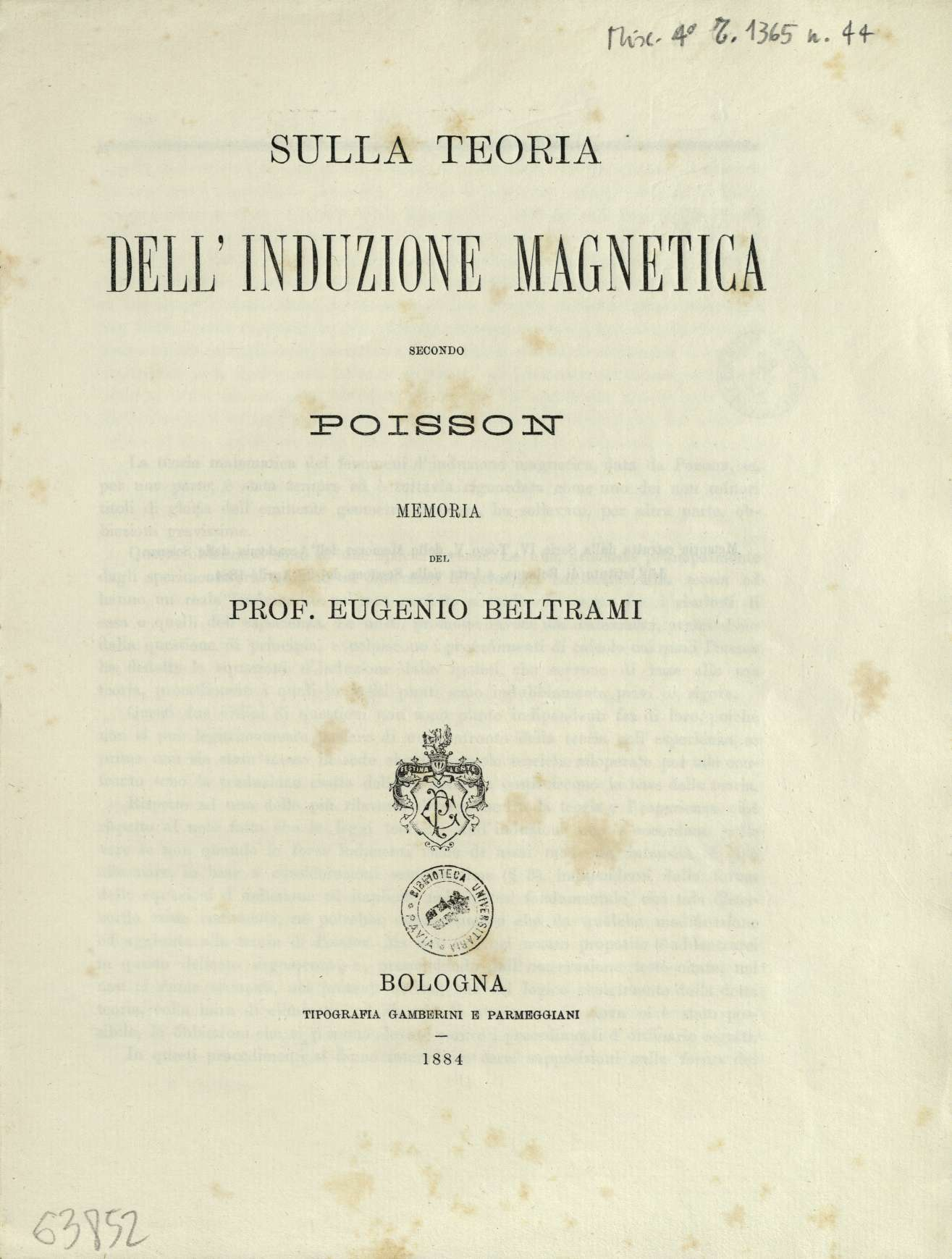
Sulla teoria dell'induzione magnetica secondo Poisson, 1884

- Beltrami, Eugenio (1868). "Saggio di interpretazione della geometria non-euclidea". Giornale di Matematiche. 6: 284–312.
- Beltrami, Eugenio (1868). "Teoria fondamentale degli spazii di curvatura costante". Annali di Matematica Pura ed Applicata. Series II. 2: 232–255. doi:10.1007/BF02419615. S2CID 120773141.
- Sulla teoria dell'induzione magnetica secondo Poisson (in Italian). Bologna. 1884.
- Opere matematiche di Eugenio Beltrami pubblicate per cura della Facoltà di scienze della r. Università di Roma (volumes 1–2) (U. Hoepli, Milano, 1902–1920)
- Same edition, vols. 1–4
