= List of Italian mathematicians =

A list of notable mathematicians from Italy by century:

== Ancient ==
- Marcus Terentinus Varro
- Boethius
- Vitruvius

== 12th–15th centuries ==
=== 12th century ===
- Plato Tiburtinus

=== 13th century ===
- Guido Bonatti
- Campano da Novara
- Leonardo Fibonacci

=== 14th century ===
- Paolo dell'Abbaco

== 15th century ==
- Leon Battista Alberti
- Piero Borgi
- Leonardo da Vinci
- Scipione del Ferro
- Giovanni di Gherardo da Prato
- Luca Pacioli
- Piero della Francesca
- Paolo dal Pozzo Toscanelli
- Antonio Tucci Manetti

== 16th century ==
=== A ===
- Camillo Agrippa
- Andrea Argoli

=== B ===
- Bernardino Baldi
- Francesco Barozzi
- Giambattista Benedetti
- Rutilio Benincasa
- Giuseppe Biancani
- Rafael Bombelli

=== C ===
- Girolamo Cardano
- Pietro Antonio Cataldi
- Bonaventura Cavalieri
- Federico Commandino

=== D ===
- Ignazio Danti
- Guidobaldo del Monte

=== F ===
- Lodovico Ferrari
- Scipione del Ferro

=== G ===
- Galileo Galilei
- Luca Gaurico
- Marino Ghetaldi
- Orazio Grassi

=== M ===
- Giovanni Antonio Magini
- Francesco Maurolico
- Fabrizio Mordente

=== R ===
- Matteo Ricci
- Ostilio Ricci

=== S ===
- Giuseppe Scala

=== T ===
- Niccolò Tartaglia
- Gianello Torriani

=== V ===
- Luca Valerio

== 17th century ==
=== A ===
- Niccolò Aggiunti
- Giulio Aleni
- Andrea Argoli

=== B ===
- Giovanni Battista Baliani
- Rutilio Benincasa
- Mario Bettini
- Giuseppe Biancani
- Giovanni Alfonso Borelli
- Giovanni Antonio Borrelli
- Tito Livio Burattini

=== C ===
- Gregorio Caloprese
- Paolo Casati
- Giovanni Cassini
- Benedetto Castelli
- Pietro Antonio Cataldi
- Bonaventura Cavalieri
- Giovanni Ceva
- Tommaso Ceva
- Elena Lucrezia Cornaro
- Tommaso Cornelio

=== F ===
- Michelangelo Fardella

=== G ===
- Galileo Galilei
- Marino Ghetaldi
- Vitale Giordano
- Domenico Guglielmini

=== L ===
- Francesco Lana de Terzi

=== M ===
- Eustachio Manfredi
- Gabriele Manfredi
- Alessandro Marchetti
- Pietro Mengoli
- Geminiano Montanari

=== P ===
- Onofrio Puglisi

=== R ===
- Jacopo Riccati
- Matteo Ricci
- Michelangelo Ricci

=== S ===
- Giovanni Girolamo Saccheri
- Antonio Schinella Conti

=== T ===
- Evangelista Torricelli

=== V ===
- Vincenzo Viviani

=== Z ===
- Giovanni Battista Zupi

== 18th century ==
=== A ===
- Pietro Abbati Marescotti
- Maria Gaetana Agnesi
- Giovanni Battista Amici
- Agostino Ariani
- Giuseppe Avanzini

=== B ===
- Matteo Barbieri
- Laura Bassi
- Gabriele Bonomo
- Orazio Borgondio
- Ruggiero Giuseppe Boscovich
- Vincenzo Brunacci

=== C ===
- Antonio Caccianino
- Antonio Cagnoli
- Giuseppe Calandrelli
- Gregorio Caloprese
- Sebastiano Canterzani
- Francesco Cetti
- Giovanni Ceva
- Tommaso Ceva
- Antonio Collalto
- Domenico Corradi d'Austria
- Odoardo Corsini
- Pietro Cossali
- Giovanni Francesco Crivelli

=== D ===
- Vincenzo De Filippis

=== F ===
- Giovanni Fagnano dei Toschi
- Giulio Fagnano dei Toschi
- Michelangelo Fardella
- Nicola Fergola
- Vittorio Fossombroni
- Paolo Frisi

=== G ===
- Annibale Giordano
- Vitale Giordano
- Luigi Guido Grandi
- Domenico Guglielmini

=== J ===
- Antonio Maria Jaci

=== L ===
- Joseph-Louis Lagrange
- Giovanni Antonio Lecchi
- Antonio Maria Lorgna

=== M ===
- Gianfrancesco Malfatti
- Eustachio Manfredi
- Gabriele Manfredi
- Lorenzo Mascheroni
- Marco Mastrofini

=== O ===
- Giammaria Ortes

=== P ===
- Gioacchino Pessuti
- Giovanni Poleni

=== R ===
- Ramiro Rampinelli
- Carlo Andrea Rana
- Giordano Riccati
- Jacopo Riccati
- Vincenzo Riccati
- Paolo Ruffini

=== S ===
- Giovanni Girolamo Saccheri
- Giovanni Francesco Salvemini
- Antonio Schinella Conti
- Simone Stratico

=== V ===
- Domenico Vandelli
- Francesco Vandelli

== 19th century ==
=== A ===
- Pietro Abbati Marescotti
- Achille Sannia
- Cataldo Agostinelli
- Cesare Aimonetti
- Rosario Alagna
- Cristoforo Alasia
- Giacomo Albanese
- Giuseppe Albeggiani
- Alberto Alessio
- Emilio Almansi
- Ugo Amaldi
- Domenico Amanzio
- Enrico Amaturo
- Giovanni Battista Amici
- Federico Amodeo
- Luigi Amoroso
- Giovanni Antonelli
- Michele Araldi
- Angelo Armenante
- Cesare Arzelà
- Ferdinando Aschieri
- Giulio Ascoli
- Giuseppe Avanzini
- Mattia Azzarelli

=== B ===
- Giuseppe Bardelli
- Pacifico Barilari
- Giuseppe Barilli
- Giovanni Barsotti
- Anselmo Bassani
- Giuseppe Basso
- Giuseppe Battaglini
- Giacomo Bellacchi
- Giusto Bellavitis
- Giuseppe Belli
- Serafino Belli
- Eugenio Beltrami
- Timoteo Bertelli
- Eugenio Bertini
- Luigi Berzolari
- Davide Besso
- Rodolfo Bettazzi
- Enrico Betti
- Luigi Bianchi
- Giorgio Bidone
- Pietro Blaserna
- Carlo Bonacini
- Baldassarre Boncompagni
- Giovanni Bordiga
- Antonio Maria Bordoni
- Ettore Bortolotti
- Francesco Brioschi
- Vincenzo Brunacci
- Giuseppe Bruno
- Cesare Burali-Forti
- Pietro Burgatti

=== C ===
- Antonio Caccianino
- Giuseppe Calandrelli
- Alfredo Capelli
- Ernesto Capocci di Belmonte
- Ettore Caporali
- Francesco Carlini
- Felice Casorati (mathematician)
- Filiberto Castellano
- Guido Castelnuovo
- Carlo Alberto Castigliano
- Sebastiano Catania
- Tito Camillo Cazzaniga
- Francesco Cecioni
- Vincenzo Cerulli
- Ernesto Cesàro
- Mineo Chini
- Felice Chiò
- Edgardo Ciani
- Domenico Cipolletti
- Giuseppe Ciscato
- Delfino Codazzi
- Ottavio Colecchi
- Antonio Collalto
- Annibale Comessatti
- Francesco Contarino
- Filippo Corridi
- Luigi Cremona

=== D ===
- Enrico D'Ovidio
- Ugo Dainelli
- Enrico De Amicis
- Giovanni De Berardinis
- Annibale De Gasparis
- Riccardo De Paolis
- Vincenzo De Rossi Re
- Antonio De Zolt
- Guelfo Del Prete
- Alfonso Del Re
- Ercole Dembowski
- Alfonso Di Legge
- Giovanni Di Pirro
- Ulisse Dini
- Giovanni Battista Donati
- Luigi Donati
- Alessandro Dorna
- Enrico Ducci

=== F ===
- Francesco Faà di Bruno
- Aureliano Faifofer
- Antonio Fais
- Giovanni Taddeo Farini
- Gaetano Fazzari
- Emanuele Fergola
- Nicola Fergola
- Gaspare Stanislao Ferrari
- Camillo Ferrati
- Annibale Ferrero
- Cesare Finzi
- Vincenzo Flauti
- Francesco Flores D'Arcais
- Vittorio Fossombroni
- Giovanni Frattini

=== G ===
- Michele Gebbia
- Angelo Genocchi
- Annibale Giordano
- Gaetano Giorgini
- Giuseppe Bruno
- Carlo Ignazio Giulio
- Paolo Gorini
- Maria Gramegna

=== L ===
- Giuseppe Lauricella
- Giovanni Maria Lavagna
- Tullio Levi-Civita
- Guglielmo Libri Carucci dalla Sommaja
- Gino Loria

=== M ===
- Gian Antonio Maggi
- Roberto Marcolongo
- Marco Mastrofini
- Luigi Federico Menabrea
- Serafino Rafaele Minich
- Giacinto Morera
- Ottaviano Fabrizio Mossotti

=== N ===
- Angiolo Nardi Dei

=== O ===
- Barnaba Oriani

=== P ===
- Ernesto Padova
- Ernesto Pascal
- Giuseppe Peano
- Mario Pieri
- Salvatore Pincherle
- Gabrio Piola
- Giovanni Antonio Amedeo Plana
- Luigi Poletti
- Sebastiano Purgotti

=== R ===
- Michele Rajna
- Gregorio Ricci-Curbastro
- Raffaele Rubini
- Paolo Ruffini

=== S ===
- Leonardo Salimbeni
- Agatino San Martino Pardo
- Giovanni Santini
- Corrado Segre
- Quintino Sella
- Francesco Siacci
- Simone Stratico

=== T ===
- Barnaba Tortolini
- Virgilio Trettenero
- Domenico Turazza

=== V ===
- Giovanni Vailati
- Adolfo Venturi
- Giuseppe Veronese
- Giulio Vivanti
- Vito Volterra

=== Z ===
- Michele Zannotti
- Giuseppe Zurria

== 20th century ==
=== A ===
- Cataldo Agostinelli
- Amedeo Agostini
- Cesare Aimonetti
- Rosario Alagna
- Cristoforo Alasia
- Giacomo Albanese
- Maria Ales
- Alberto Alessio
- Emilio Almansi
- Ugo Amaldi (1875–1957)
- Vincenzo Amato
- Enrico Amaturo
- Luigi Amerio
- Federico Amodeo
- Luigi Amoroso
- Giulio Andreoli
- Aldo Andreotti (1924–1980)
- Enrico Arbarello (1945–)
- Gino Arrighi
- Emilio Artom
- Cesare Arzelà
- Guido Ascoli
- Giuseppe Avondo Bodino

=== B ===
- Giuseppe Bagnera
- Emilio Baiada
- Mario Baldassarri (mathematician)
- Silvio Ballarin
- Ubaldo Barbieri
- Ugo Barbuti
- Giulio Cesare Barozzi
- Jacopo Barsotti
- Umberto Bartocci
- Giuseppe Bartolozzi
- Antonio Beccadelli
- Alberto Maria Bedarida
- Giacomo Bellacchi
- Margherita Beloch Piazzolla
- Azeglio Bemporad
- Giulio Bemporad
- Alberto Beneduce (1877–1944)
- Vladimiro Bernstein (1900–1936)
- Eugenio Bertini
- Luigi Berzolari
- Rodolfo Bettazzi
- Emilio Bianchi
- Luigi Bianchi
- Giuseppina Masotti Biggiogero
- Giulio Bisconcini
- Pietro Blaserna
- Giovanni Boaga
- Tommaso Boggio
- Enrico Boggio Lera
- Corrado Böhm
- Enrico Bombieri (1940–)
- Enrico Bompiani
- Carlo Bonacini
- Colombo Bonaparte
- Carlo Emilio Bonferroni
- Giovanni Bordiga
- Agostino Borio
- Enea Bortolotti
- Ettore Bortolotti
- Giovanni Bottino Barzizza
- Franco Brezzi (1945–)
- Ugo Napoleone Giuseppe Broggi
- Luigi Brusotti
- Cesare Burali-Forti
- Pietro Burgatti
- Filippo Burzio
- Pietro Buzano

=== C ===
- Angelina Cabras
- Renato Caccioppoli
- Federico Cafiero
- Eugenio Calabi (1923–2023)
- Pasquale Calapso
- Renato Calapso
- Bruto Caldonazzo
- Domenico Caligo
- Luigi Campedelli
- Giacomo Candido
- Francesco Paolo Cantelli
- Alfredo Capelli
- Milvio Capovani
- Luigi Carnera
- Gino Cassinis
- Emma Castelnuovo
- Guido Castelnuovo
- Sebastiano Catania
- Carlo Cattaneo (mathematician)
- Francesco Cecioni
- Carlo Cercignani (1939–2010)
- Vincenzo Cerulli
- Lamberto Cesari (1910–1990)
- Mineo Chini
- Oscar Chisini
- Edgardo Ciani
- Michele Cipolla
- Giuseppe Colombo
- Gustavo Colonnetti
- Paul G. Comba
- Annibale Comessatti
- Caterina Consani
- Francesco Contarino
- Alberto Conti
- Roberto Conti (mathematician) (1923–2006)
- Eugenio Curiel

=== D ===
- Enrico D'Ovidio
- Luigi Sante Da Rios
- Vittorio Dalla Volta
- Gabriele Darbo
- Enrico De Amicis
- Giovanni De Berardinis
- Corrado De Concini (1949–)
- Michele De Franchis
- Ennio De Giorgi (1928–1996)
- Luciano De Simon
- Antonio De Zolt
- Gabriella Del Grosso
- Pasquale del Pezzo
- Alfonso Del Re
- Ettore Del Vecchio
- Alfonso Di Legge
- Giovanni Di Pirro
- Ulisse Dini (1845–1918)
- Luigi Donati
- Paolo Dore
- Enrico Ducci

=== E ===
- Renato Einaudi
- Federigo Enriques (1871–1946)

=== F ===
- Alessandro Faedo
- Antonio Fais
- Gino Fano
- Luigi Fantappiè
- Antonio Favaro
- Gaetano Fazzari
- Urbano Federighi
- Giorgio Ferrarese
- Giuseppe Ferrario
- Gaetano Fichera (1922–1996)
- Alessandro Figà Talamanca (1938–2023)
- Bruno de Finetti (1906–1985)
- Aldo Finzi (mathematician)
- Bruno Finzi
- Francesco Flores D'Arcais
- Mauro Francaviglia (1953–2013)
- Giovanni Frattini
- Guido Fubini

=== G ===
- Giovanni Gallavotti (1941–)
- Dionigi Galletto
- Adriano Garsia (1928–2024)
- Michele Gebbia
- Ludovico Geymonat
- Narancia Ghirga
- Corrado Gini
- Maria Gramegna

=== K ===
- Giulio Krall

=== L ===
- Ernesto Laura
- Orazio Lazzarino
- Beppo Levi
- Eugenio Elia Levi
- Tullio Levi-Civita
- Gino Loria

=== M ===
- Enrico Magenes (1923–2010)
- Gian Antonio Maggi
- Carlo Felice Manara
- Ermanno Marchionna
- Roberto Marcolongo
- Carlo Miranda (1912–1982)
- Mario Miranda (1937–2017)
- Ugo Morin

=== N ===
- Pia Nalli

=== O ===
- Piergiorgio Odifreddi (1950–)
- Adalberto Orsatti

=== P ===
- Alessandro Padoa
- Attilio Palatini
- Ernesto Pascal
- Giuseppe Peano
- Mauro Picone (1885–1977)
- Mario Pieri
- Salvatore Pincherle (1853–1936)
- Luigi Poletti
- Giuseppe Pompilj (1913–1968)
- Claudio Procesi (1941–)
- Giovanni Prodi (1925–2010)

=== Q ===
- Alfio Quarteroni (1952–)

=== R ===
- Giulio Racah
- Lucio Lombardo Radice
- Michele Rajna
- Tullio Regge
- Arturo Reghini
- Gregorio Ricci-Curbastro (1853–1925)
- Gian-Carlo Rota (1932–1999)
- Lucio Russo

=== S ===
- Nicola Salvatore Dino
- Giovanni Sansone (1888–1979)
- Umberto Scarpis
- Gaetano Scorza (1876–1939)
- Beniamino Segre (1903–1977)
- Corrado Segre
- Francesco Severi
- Antonio Signorini
- Emilio Spedicato
- Franco Spisani
- Guido Stampacchia

=== T ===
- Eugenio Giuseppe Togliatti
- Leonida Tonelli
- Francesco Giacomo Tricomi

=== V ===
- Giovanni Vacca
- Edoardo Vesentini
- Giuseppe Vitali
- Giulio Vivanti
- Vito Volterra

=== Z ===
- Giuseppe Zwirner
