= Antonio Collalto =

Antonio Collalto may refer to:

- Antonio Collalto (dramatist), Italian actor and dramatist
- Antonio Collalto (mathematician), Italian mathematician

== See also ==
- Collalto (disambiguation)
