= Sannia =

Sannia is a surname. Notable people with the name include:

- Achille Sannia (1822–1892), Italian mathematician and politician
- Gustavo Sannia, Italian mathematician
- Marisa Sannia, Italian singer
- Sannia (musician), Australian musician Jackie Sannia
