= Fardella =

Fardella may refer to:

- Fardella, Basilicata, an Italian municipality
- Vincenzo Fardella di Torrearsa, President of the Italian Senate 1870-1874
- Michelangelo Fardella (1646-1718), Italian philosopher
