= Paolo Ruffini (disambiguation) =

Paolo Ruffini may refer to:

- Paolo Ruffini (mathematician) (1765-1822) - Italian mathematician and philosopher
  - 8524 Paoloruffini, a minor planet named for the mathematician
- Paolo Ruffini (actor) (1978) - Italian actor, film director and presenter
