= D'Ovidio =

D'Ovidio or d'Ovidio is a surname. Notable people with the surname include:

- Antonio Lefebvre d'Ovidio, Italian lawyer, businessman, founder of Silversea Cruises
- Catherine D'Ovidio, French bridge player
- Elisa D'Ovidio, Australian soccer player
- Enrico D'Ovidio, Italian mathematician
- Francesco D'Ovidio, Italian philologist and literary critic
- Manfredi Lefebvre d'Ovidio, Italian-born Monegasque billionaire businessman

== See also ==
- Ovidio
