= Pietro Abbati Marescotti =

Italian mathematician (1768–1842)

- Born: 1768; Modena
- Died: May 7, 1842 (aged 73)
- Occupation: Mathematician

Academic background
- Education: University of Modena

Academic work
- Discipline: Mathematics
- Institutions: Modena; ministry of state economics and education

Pietro Abbati Marescotti (1 September 1768 – 7 May 1842) was an Italian mathematician who taught in Modena.

== Biography ==
Born in Modena, Pietro Abbati descended from a 16th-century noble family who were related to the Marescotti local family. In acknowledgment of his mathematical and artistic distinction, and in return for his services managing the water and street systems of Modena, Abbati was permitted in 1818 to add the name Marescotti to his own surname.

He was born in Modena and received a superior education in mathematics at the university there, studying with Luigi Fantini, Paolo Cassiani and Giovanni Battista Venturi. In an 1802 letter to his friend Paolo Ruffini, Abbati extended the proof to the unsolvability of equations of degree greater than five. In 1807, he was named as an advisor to Francis IV, Duke of Modena. Three years later, he became ministry of state economics and education, with particular responsibility for waterworks and streets.

In 1824, he published On a problem of Daniel Bernoulli and Lagrange. In 1826, he was named a member of the Accademia nazionale delle scienze detta dei XL ("National Association of the Sciences", also known as "Academy of the Forty"), a learned society composed of forty eminent Italian scientists.

== Mathematics ==
He was friends with Paolo Ruffini his entire life, and engaged in mathematical research with him (although without any official recognition), especially in the areas of algebraic equations, probability, and group theory. Indeed, it appears that Abbati suggested the idea of group theory to Ruffini, who subsequently expanded it.

Abbati's investigations and exchanges with Ruffini also examined diophantine equations, prime numbers, the specification of the number of imaginary roots as compared with the results of Pietro Paoli, the relation among the roots and the coefficients of an equation, the Cartesian rule for incomplete equations, the properties of permutations of the roots of quartic and quintic equations, the equation of differences, rational functions of roots, resolution by approximation, and the related Lagrange multipliers.

The thirty letters which Abbati wrote to Ruffini are now housed in the Ruffini Archive of the Biblioteca Estense in Modena. All the letters remain unpublished except one published by Ettore Bortolotti in an edition of Ruffini's correspondence.
