= Giovanni Sante Gaspero Santini =

Italian astronomer and mathematician (1786–1976)

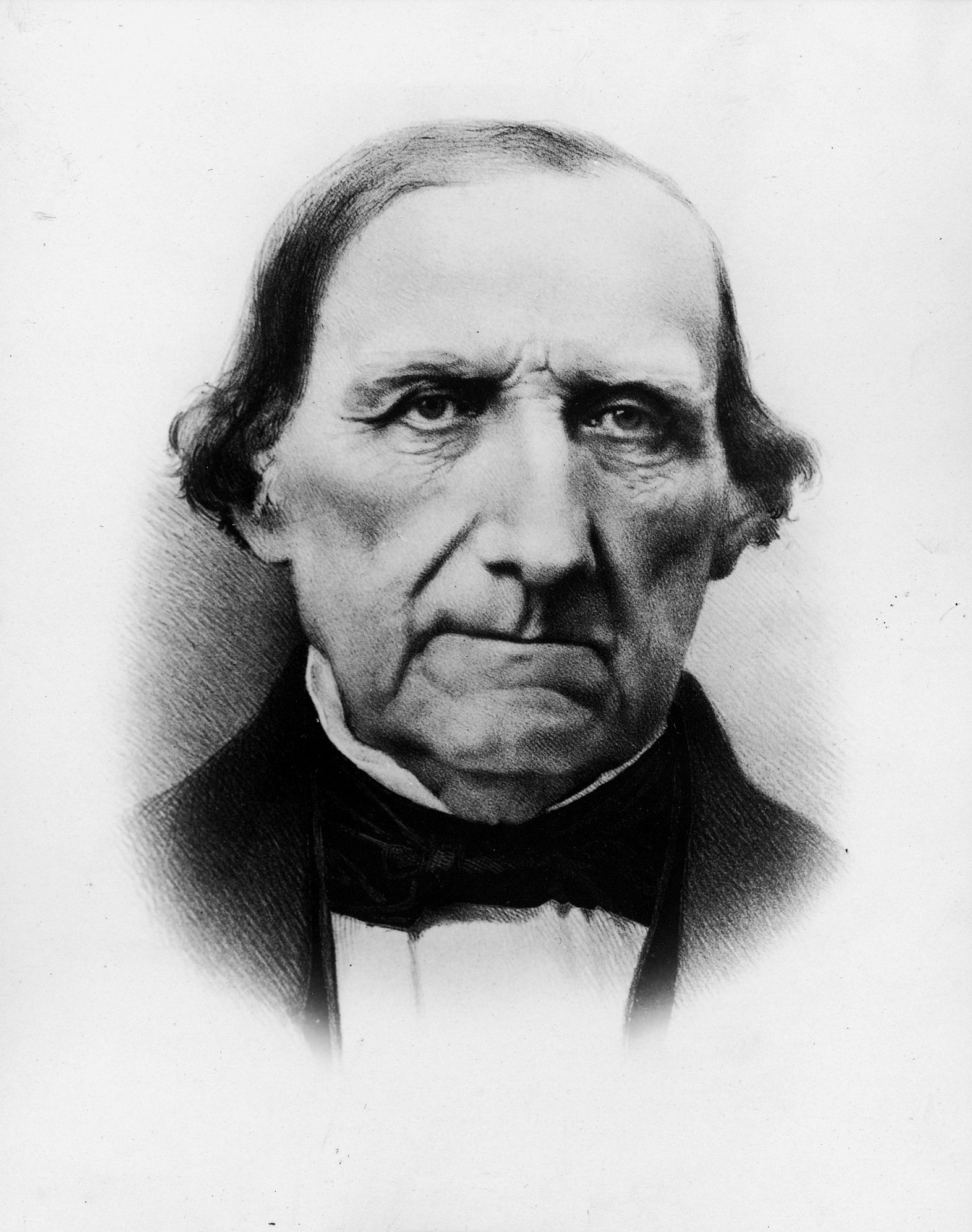
- Born: 30 June 1786; Caprese, Grand Duchy of Tuscany
- Died: 26 June 1877 (aged 90); Noventa Padovana, Kingdom of Italy
- Education: University of Pisa
- Scientific career
- Fields: Astronomy
- Workplaces: Observatory of Padua

Giovanni Sante Gaspero Santini (b. Caprese in Tuscany, 30 June 1786; d. Noventa Padovana, 26 June 1877) was an Italian astronomer and mathematician.

== Biography ==
Gaspero received his first instruction from his parental uncle, the Abbot Giovanni Battista Santini. After finishing his philosophical studies in the school year 1801–2, at the seminary of Prato, he entered in 1802 the University of Pisa. He very soon abandoned the study of law in order to devote himself, under the direction of Prof. Paoli and Abbot Pacchiano, exclusively to mathematics and the natural sciences. It appears that at Pisa, Santini still wore the cassock, with the consequence that in bibliographical dictionaries he still figures under the title of abate. It is certain, however, that he never received major orders.

In 1810 he married Teresa Pastrovich, and one year after her death, in 1843, he contracted a second marriage with Adriana Conforti, who outlived him. During his stay in Pisa he became friendly with the rector of the university and of the influential Vittorio Fossombroni. At their urgent suggestion Santini's family, especially his uncle, made great sacrifices to enable him to continue his studies in Milan (1805–1806) under Barnaba Oriani, Cesaris, and Francesco Carlini. On 17 Oct., 1806, the Italian Government appointed him assistant to the director of the observatory at Padua, Abate Chiminello, whom he succeeded in 1814. In 1813 the university offered him the chair of astronomy, a position in which he was confirmed by the Emperor Francis I in 1818 after the Venetian territory had become part of Austria. In addition he taught for several years, as substitute, elementary algebra, geometry, and higher mathematics. During the school years 1824-1825 and 1856-1857 he was rector of the university, and from 1845 to 1872 director of mathematical studies. Towards the end of 1873 he suffered repeatedly from fainting spells which were followed by a steadily increasing physical and mental weakness and final breakdown. He died in his ninety-first year at his villa, Noventa Padovana.

== Astronomical work ==
Both as a practical and theoretical astronomer, Santini made the Observatory of Padua famous. When he took charge the observatory was located in an old fortified tower, in a reportedly precarious condition, but he refurbished it. In 1811 he determined the latitude of Padua with the aid of Gauss's method of three stars in the same altitude, and in 1815 again, with a new repeating circle. In 1822, '24, and '28 he assisted the astronomical and geodetic service of Italy by making observations in longitude. Constantly striving to equip this institute in accordance with the latest requirements of science, he installed in 1823 a new Utzschneider equatorial, and in 1837 a new meridian circle. With these last he began at once to make zonal observations for a catalogue of stars between declination +10° and -10°, an undertaking which he carried out on a large scale, and which he, with the aid of his assistant, Trettenero, completed in 1857, after ten years of work.

In 1843 he made a scientific journey through Germany, and meeting scientists in his own and related fields. In the Encke-Galle catalogue he is credited with the calculation of nineteen comet orbits. He acquired his greatest repute by his calculations of the orbital disturbances during the period from 1832 to 1852 caused by the great planets on the comet of Biela. The time and place of the appearance of this comet in 1846 corresponded exactly with previous calculations. In 1819-20 he published his Elementi di Astronomia (2nd ed., Padua, 1830), a work in two parts. In 1828 appeared his Teorica degli Stromenti Ottici, also published in Padua, in which he explains by means of simple formulas the construction of the different kinds of telescopes, microscopes etc. A number of his dissertations on geodetic and astronomic subjects appeared in the annals of learned associations, in the Correspondence du Baron de Zach, Astronomische Nachrichten, etc. Besides some twenty Italian scientific societies, Santini became a member in 1825 of the London Royal Astronomical Society; in 1845 a corresponding member of the Institut de France; and in 1847 member of the Kaiserliche Akademie der Wissenschaften of Vienna. When in 1866 Venice was separated from Austria, he became a corresponding member of the last-named association. Danish, Austrian, Spanish, and Italian decorations were bestowed upon him. A complete list of his writings may be found in the "Discorso" (pp. 42–67) by Lorenzoni, mentioned below.

== Sources ==
Attribution

- Cites:
  - LORENZONI, Giovanni Santini, la sua vita e le sue opere. Discorso letto nella chiesa di S. Sofia in Padova (Padua, 1877); idem, In occasione del primo centenario dalla nascita dell' astronomo Santini (Padua, 1887);
  - POGGENDORFF, Biograf. litt. Handb., II (Leipzig, 1859)
