= Cristoforo Alasia de Quesada =

Italian mathematician (1864–1918)

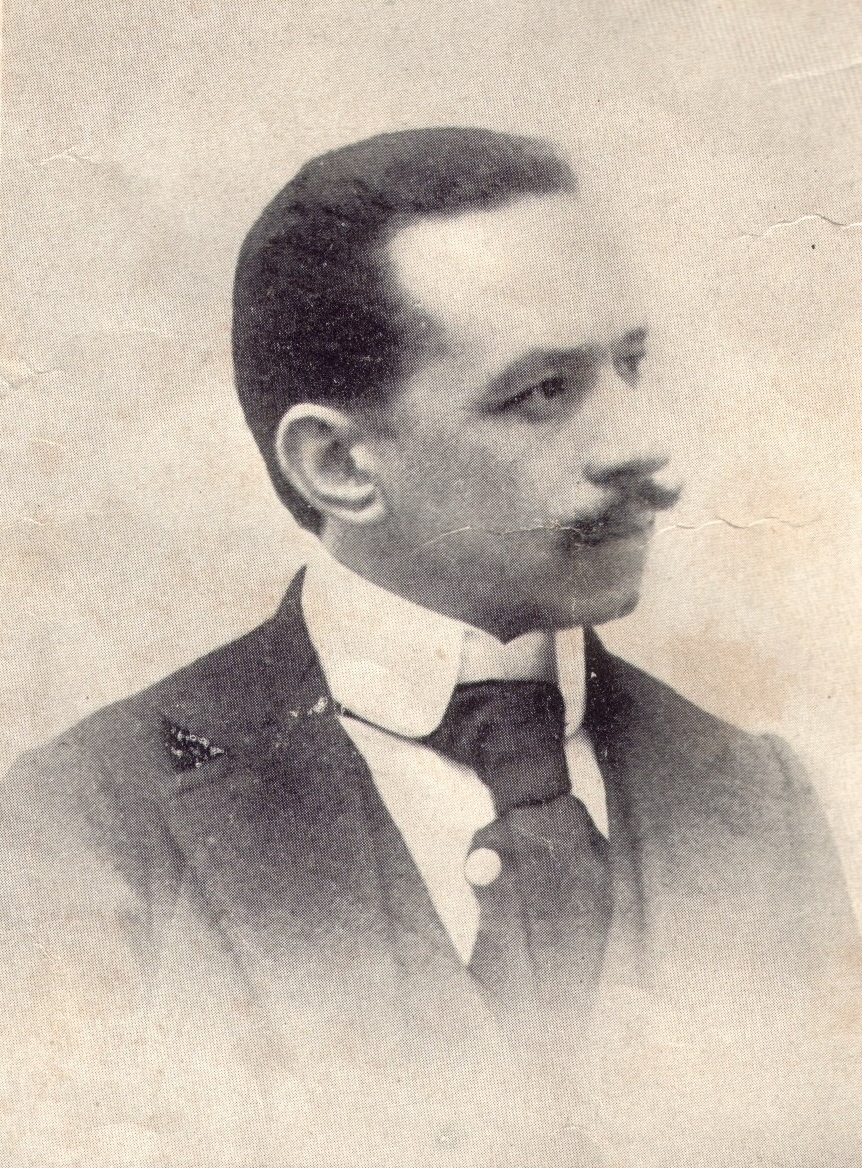
- Born: 21 November 1864; Sassari, Sardinia, Italy
- Died: 19 November 1918 (aged 53); Albenga, Italy
- Education: University of Cagliari; University of Turin; University of Rome La Sapienza
- Scientific career
- Fields: Mathematics
- Workplaces: High schools

Cristoforo Alasia de Quesada (1864–1918) was an Italian mathematician.

== Life and work ==
Alasia studied at the universities of Turin (under Enrico D'Ovidio and Giuseppe Peano) and Rome (under Luigi Cremona). In 1893 began his academic career as mathematics professor in different high schools at Sassari, Tempio Pausania, Oristano, Ozieri, Brindisi and, finally, at Albenga.

Alasia was well known at the beginning of 20th century for he was the founder of Le Matematiche Pure e Applicate, a journal devoted to the improvement of scientific knowledge of mathematics teachers.

== Bibliography ==
- Enea, Maria Rosaria (2018). "Circulation of an editorial model: The case-study of the short-lived Le Matematiche Pure ed Applicate". Historia Mathematica. 45 (4): 395–413. doi:10.1016/j.hm.2018.10.003. hdl:11563/135712. ISSN 0315-0860.
- Furinghetti, Fulvia (2002). "Il Bolletino della Mathesis dal 1909 al 1920: pulsione tra teme didattici intermazionali e nazionali". In Giorgio Bolondi (ed.). Pristem storia. Note di matematica, storia, cultura, Volum 5 (in Italian). Springer. pp. 31–. ISBN 978-88-470-0177-0.
- Furinghetti, Fulvia (2012). "Secondary teachers in the unified Italy: a group portrait with a zoom". In Kristín Bjarnadóttir; Fulvia Furinghetti; José Manuel Matos; Gert Schubring (eds.). Dig where you stand 2. Proceedings of the second International conference on the history of mathematics education. UIED. pp. 181–202. ISBN 978-989-97487-2-9.
- Halsted, George Bruce (1902). "Cristoforo Alasia". The American Mathematical Monthly. 9 (8–9): 183–185. doi:10.1080/00029890.1902.12000862. ISSN 0002-9890.
