= Gustavo Sannia =

Italian mathematician (1875–1930)

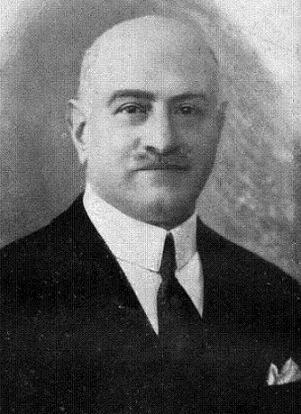
Portrait of Gustavo Sannia

Gustavo Sannia (13 May 1875 – 21 December 1930) was an Italian mathematician working in differential geometry, projective geometry, and summation of series. He was the son of Achille Sannia, mathematician and senator of the Kingdom of Italy.

== Biography ==
Gustavo Sannia was born in Naples.

Sannia lived in Turin from 1902 to 1915 and from 1919 to 1922, first as an assistant to D'Ovidio and Fubini and later as a professor. From 1915 to 1919, he taught at the University of Cagliari.

Sannia returned to Naples in 1924, where he would remain until his premature death.

== Selected publications ==
- "Deformazioni infinitesime delle curve inestendibili e corrispondenza per ortogonalità di elementi." Rendiconti del Circolo Matematico di Palermo (1884–1940) 21, no. 1 (1906): 229–256. doi:10.1007/BF03013473
- "Nuova esposizione della geometria infinitesimale délle congruenze rettilinee." Annali di Matematica Pura ed Applicata (1898–1922) 15, no. 1 (1908): 143–185. doi:10.1007/BF02419759
- "Nuovo metodo per lo studio delle congruenze e dei complessi di raggi." Rendiconti del Circolo Matematico di Palermo (1884–1940) 33, no. 1 (1912): 328–340. doi:10.1007/BF03015310
- "Osservazioni sulla «Réclamation de priorité» del sig. Zindler." Annali di Matematica Pura ed Applicata (1898–1922) 19, no. 1 (1912): 57–59. doi:10.1007/BF02419391
- "Su due forme differenziali che individuano una congruenza o un complesso di rette." Rendiconti del Circolo Matematico di Palermo (1884–1940) 33, no. 1 (1912): 67–74. doi:10.1007/BF03015288
- "Sui differenziali totali di ordine superiore." Rendiconti del Circolo Matematico di Palermo (1884–1940) 36, no. 1 (1913): 305–316. doi:10.1007/BF03016036
- "Nuovo metodo di sommazione delle serie: Estensione del metodo di Borel." Rendiconti del Circolo Matematico di Palermo (1884–1940) 42, no. 1 (1916): 303–322. doi:10.1007/BF03014904
- "Riavvicinamento di geometrie differenziali delle superficie: metriche, affine, proiettiva." Annali di Matematica Pura ed Applicata (1898–1922) 31, no. 1 (1922): 165–189. doi:10.1007/BF02419749
- "Nuova trattazione della geometria proiettivo-differenziale delle curve sghembe." Annali di Matematica Pura ed Applicata 3, no. 1 (1926): 1–25. doi:10.1007/BF02418644

== Bibliography ==
- G. F. Tricomi, Matematici italiani del primo secolo dello stato unitario, Memorie dell'Accademia delle Scienze di Torino. Classe di Scienze fisiche matematiche e naturali, 4th series, vol. 1, 1962.
