= Collalto =

Collalto may refer to:

- Collalto, Susegana in the province of Treviso
  - House of Collalto, named after it
- Collalto, Penne - a frazione of Penne in the province of Pescara
- Collalto, Colle di Val d'Elsa - a frazione of Colle di Val d'Elsa in the province of Siena
- Collalto - a frazione of Tarcento in the province of Udine
- Collalto, Montebello Vicentino in the province of Vicenza
- Monte Collalto - a mountain in the Alpi Pusteresi
- Collalto Sabino - a town in the province of Rieti
- Palazzo Zane Collalto - a palazzo in Venice
- Antonio Collalto (dramatist) - Italian actor and dramatist
- Antonio Collalto (mathematician), Italian mathematician
