= Vivanti–Pringsheim theorem =

The Vivanti–Pringsheim theorem is a mathematical statement in complex analysis, that determines a specific singularity for a function described by certain type of power series. The theorem was originally formulated by Giulio Vivanti in 1893 and proved in the following year by Alfred Pringsheim.

More precisely the theorem states the following:

A complex function defined by a power series

$$f(z)=\sum_{n=0}^\infty a_nz^n$$

with non-negative real coefficients $a_n$ and a radius of convergence $R$ has a singularity at $z=R$.

A simple example is the (complex) geometric series

$$f(z)=\sum_{n=0}^\infty z^n =\frac{1}{1-z}$$

with a singularity at $z=1$.

The example of the geometric series gives an isolated singularity. An example of a series with a non-isolated singularity at $z=1$ is

$$f(z)=\sum_{n=0}^\infty z^{n!}.$$
