= Virgilio Trettenero =

Italian mathematician and astronomer (1822–1863)

Virgilio Trettenero (4 February 1822 – 23 May 1863) was an Italian mathematician and astronomer born in Recoaro Terme, Province of Vicenza, Italy. Active between 1848–1863, his name is linked to the creation of the stellar catalogs, a work initiated by Giovanni Padovani in 1838 using the meridian circle, which he purchased. The asteroid 16715 Trettenero, discovered on 20 October 1995 at the San Vittore Observatory, in Bologna, was named so in his honour.

== Life ==
Son of Domenico, owner of a hotel, and Domenica Maltauro, he studied at the University of Padua. In 1848 he appeared in the journal Astronomische Nachrichten connected to an article about the observations of the planet Neptune. The presence of the planet was postulated on the basis of the perturbation of the orbit of Uranus by Le Verrier and was observed for the first time only two years earlier.

In 1850-1851 he was nominated assistant in the department of physics and geodesy in Padua, and assistant astronomer at the Royal Observatory, under supervision of Professor Giovanni Santini in 1853. From 1859 to 1863 he was professor of physics at the faculty of mathematics and director of the physics department. In the same period he was appointed professor of astronomy in the faculty od philosophy. He died in the city of Padua, in the Veneto, northern Italy, and was succeeded by Michez Jacopo (1839-1873). His work summarizes 61 articles written in 14 years of study focused on the observation of asteroids, comets, eclipses, the calculation of planetary orbits with respect to the action of the disturbing planets of the Solar System and ephemerides.
