= Giuseppe Basso =

Italian mathematician (1842–1895)

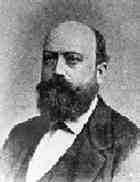
- Born: 9 November 1842; Chivasso (Turin), Kingdom of Sardinia; now Italy
- Died: 28 July 1895 (aged 52); Turin, Italy
- Education: University of Turin
- Scientific career
- Fields: Mathematics; Physics
- Workplaces: University of Turin
- Thesis: Dissertazione sulla luce polarizzata circolarmente e sulle sue applicazioni ed altre questioni di chimica (1862)

Giuseppe Basso (1842–1895) was an Italian mathematician.

== Life and work ==
Basso was born to a very poor family; he had to work with his father, a tailor, from very early age. Notwithstanding, after completing his studies in the school in Chivasso and in the high school in Turin with great success, he showed great determination to continue at university level.

In 1862, Basso was awarded the degree of Doctor of Physics by a thesis about polarized light. Few weeks ago he was appointed professor at the Military School in Turin. Simultaneously he was professor of physics in the university of Turin, first in replacement of Gilberto Gobi, the full professor, and from 1872 as assistant and from 1878 as full professor.

Basso is remembered basically by his works in physical optics.

== Bibliography ==
- Caloi, Pietro (1962). "Italian Pioneers in the Physics of the Universe: Geophysics". Cahiers d'Histoire Mondiale. 7 (1): 453–ss. ISSN 0022-5436.
- Marchisotto, Elena Anne; Smith, James T. (2007). The Legacy of Mario Pieri in Geometry and Arithmetic. Birkhäuser. ISBN 978-0-8176-3210-6.
