= Giuseppe Pompilj =

Italian statistician (1913–1968)

- Born: Rome, Italy
- Died: July 9, 1968 (aged 54); Rome, Italy
- Occupation: Statistician

Giuseppe Pompilj (17 July 1913, Rome–9 July 1968, Rome) was an Italian statistician.

== Biography ==
He graduated in mathematics in 1935 and immediately undertook a university career. In 1942 he was lecturer in geometry (he had studied algebraic geometry under the guidance of Federigo Enriques and other Roman mathematicians). After an interruption for military service and a long period of imprisonment, in 1948 Pompilj won the competition for the chair in geometry. He taught geometry and probability theory at the Faculty of Statistical Sciences, University of Rome. Probability theory became the main topic of his interests and he taught this discipline until his premature death.

His research interests are attested by seventy publications and ten printed books, ranging across a broad spectrum of topics: algebraic geometry, the random sampling theory, the probabilistic analysis of experiments and especially the theory of random variables. This topic is certainly one of the most attractive for Pompilj because he found in it a fruitful field for the application of geometric concepts and because it could represent the unification of fields(not merely formal) of probability and statistics. Among the many initiatives taken to facilitate statistical studies in Italy, a special mention must go to "Courses of Statistical Methods for Researchers", which he organized in Rome in 1958. The lessons taught in these courses by a large number of distinguished professors were collected in several volumes, which still provides one of the most comprehensive presentations in this field.

== Publications ==
- Sulla regressione, Rend. Mat. E sue applicazioni, (1946);
- Sulla media di una distribuzione normale, Statistica, (1947);
- Complementi di calcolo delle probabilità, Veschi, Roma (1948);
- Metodologia statistica. Integrazione e comparazione dei dati (con C. Gini, 1949);
- Sulle medie combinatorie potenziate dei campioni, Rend. Sem. matematico, Padova, (1949);
- La teoria affine delle variabili casuali, L’industria, (1956);
- Piano degli esperimenti (con G. Dall'Aglio, (1959);
- Elaborazione probabilistica dei risultati sperimentali, Atti V Convegno UMI, (1956);
- Teoria dei campioni, Veschi, Roma, (1956);
- Probability Theory, University of Pittsburgh, (1963–64).
