= Onofrio Puglisi =

Italian mathematician (died 1679)

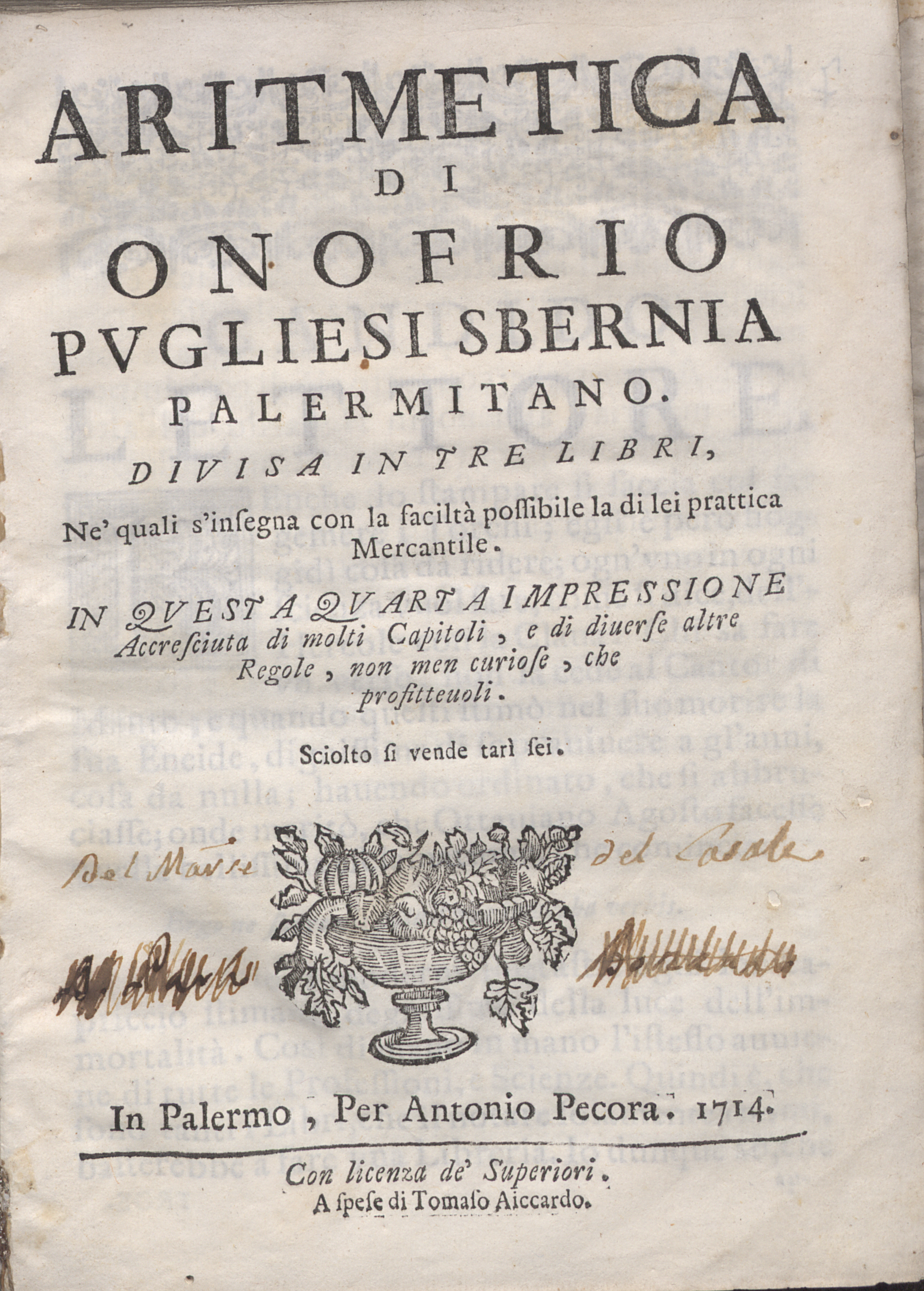
Aritmetica, title page (1714)

Onofrio Puglisi, also known as Onofrio Pugliesi Sbernia (died on 11 January 1679), was an Italian mathematician from Palermo.

He was the first writer of accounting books in southern Italy.

== Works ==
- Aritmetica [Arithmetic] (in Italian) (4 ed.). Palermo: Antonio Pecora & Tomaso Aiccardo. 1714 [1634].
- Prattica economica numerale [Numeral Economic Practice] (in Italian). Palermo: Agostino Bossio. 1671.
