= Antonio Fais =

Italian mathematician and railway engineer (1841–1925)

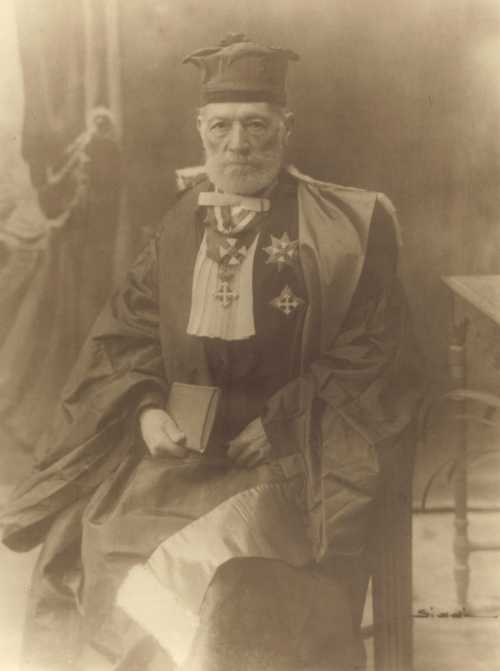
- Born: April 25, 1841; Ploaghe
- Died: April 20, 1925 (aged 83); Sassari
- Education: University of Turin
- Scientific career
- Fields: Differential equations, differential geometry
- Workplaces: University of Bologna; University of Cagliari
- Thesis: Intorno ai combustibili Industriali (1864)

Antonio Fais (25 April 1841 – 20 April 1925) was an Italian mathematician and railway engineer. He was rector at the University of Cagliari from 1897 to 1898.

As an engineer he worked for the Royal Sardinian Railways for the development of the rail line sector located next to the town of Oristano.

In 1865 was appointed professor of infinitesimal calculus and algebra at the University of Cagliari.

He moved at the University of Bologna in 1876, where he taught infinitesimal calculus and algebra, and graphical statics.

His main scientific activity in the field of mathematics was focused on the study of the differential geometry of curves and surfaces and the differential equations, on which he published several articles.

Due to his scientific activity, Fais was awarded with the Benedictine medal by the Accademia di Bologna, in 1897, with the Cross Order of Saints Maurice and Lazarus in 1897 and was appointed Knight of the Order of the Crown of Italy in 1905.

During his life, Fais met and worked jointly with several contemporary prominent mathematicians, such as the Italians Felice Casorati, Antonio Pacinotti and Eugenio Beltrami, and the French Joseph Louis Bertrand.

== Works ==
- Intorno ai combustibili Industriali, Tesi di Laurea, Torino, 1864.
- Le Ferrovie Sarde, Cagliari, 1866.
- Trattato di Trigonometria Rettilinea – Torino, 1868.
- Note intorno ad alcune questioni di Matematica – Cagliari, 1871.
- Nota intorno ad alcune formule che si deducono da quelle di Taylor, Giornale di Matematiche di *Battaglini – Napoli – Vol. XII, – 1874.
- Nota sulla ricerca dell'equazione dell'inviluppo di una serie di curve piane, Giornale di Matematiche, Napoli, Vol. XII, – 1874.
- Nota sopra una forma compendiata delle equazioni differenziali, Giornale di Metamatiche, Vol. XII, 1874.
- Nota intorno alle derivate di ordine superiore delle funzioni di funzione, Giornale di Matematiche, Napoli, Vol. XIII, 1875.
- Nota intorno all'integrazione delle equazioni differenziali totali di 10 ordine e grado, Giornale di Matematiche, Napoli, Vol. XIII, 1875.
- Memoria intorno ad alcune formule e proprietà delle curve gobbe, Giornale di Matematiche, Napoli, Vol. XIV, 1876.
- Note intorno ad alcune formule relative al cambiamento delle variabili indipendenti, Rend. Acc. delle Scienze dell'Istituto di Bologna, marzo 1877.
- Nota intorno ad alcune proprietà delle rette coniugate. Memorie dell'Acc. delle Scienze dell'Istituto di Bologna, serie 3a, Tomo VII, 1877.
- Memorie intorno alle curve gobbe aventi le stesse normali principali, Memorie dell'Acc. delle Scienze dell'Istituto di Bologna, serie 3a, Tomo VIII, 1878.
- Nota intorno all'eliminazione delle funzioni arbitrarie, Memorie dell'Acc. delle Scienze dell'Istituto di Bologna, serie 3a, Tomo IX, 1879.
- Memoria intorno ad alcune proprietà delle curve gobbe aventi le stesse normali principali, Memorie dell'Acc. delle Scienze dell'Istituto di Bologna, serie 3a, Tomo IX, 1879.
- Memoria intorno alle principali proprietà delle traiettorie ortogonali delle generatrici delle superficie rigate, Mem. dell'Acc. delle Scienze, serie 4a, Tomo I, 1880.
- La teoria dinamica del calore e le sue conseguenze circa lo stato presente ed avvenire dell'Universo, *Discorso inaugurale per l'A.A. 1881/82, Cagliari 1882.
- Memoria intorno all'integrazione delle equazioni alle derivate parziali del 10 ordine a 4 o più *variabili indipendenti, Mem. dell'Acc. delle Scienze, serie 4a, Tomo II, Bologna, 1882.
- Nota intorno ad una classificazione delle superfici gobbe, Mem. dell'Acc. delle Scienze, 1883.
- Nota sopra alcuni casi d'integrazione delle equazioni differenziali totali ed 10 ordine e grado a tre variabili, Acc. delle Scienze, Bologna 1894.
- Nota intorno alla misura degli angoli piani e degli archi di circolo, Bollettini di Matematica, Bologna, 1912.
- L'ora dell'Europa centrale, Bollettino del Collegio degli Ingegneri ed Architetti della Sardegna, 1914.

== See also ==
- Curve
- Surface

== Biographical references ==
- Bande, Gianluca; Caddeo, Renzo; Franzoni, Gregorio; Montaldo, Stefano; Musio, Monica; Piu, Paola, eds. (2010), Antonio FAIS (in Italian), Do You play Mathematics Group. The web page on Antonio Fais cured by the "Do You play Mathematics" didactics group at the University of Cagliari.
- Dell'Aglio, Luca (1994), "FAIS, Antonio", Dizionario Biografico degli Italiani (in Italian), vol. 44, Enciclopedia Treccani.
- Tricomi, G. F. (1962), "Antonio FAIS", Matematici italiani del primo secolo dello stato unitario, Memorie dell'Accademia delle Scienze di Torino. Classe di Scienze Fisiche Matematiche e Naturali, series IV (in Italian), I: 50, Zbl 0132.24405, archived from the original on 2012-07-17. Available from the website of the. "Italian mathematicians of the first century of the unitary state" (English translation of the title) is an ample historical paper written by Francesco Tricomi to commemorate all Italian mathematicians who worked during the first century of the Italian State.
- Usai, G. (1928), "Riflessioni sull'opera: Antonio Fais — Pagine autobiografiche", Il Bollettino di Matematica, Serie II (in Italian), VII: XXV–XXIX, JFM 54.0037.07.
