= Ugo Morin =

Italian mathematician and antifascist (1901–1968)

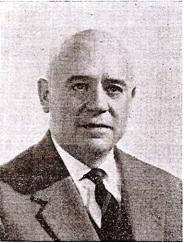
Ugo Morin

Ugo Morin (February 7, 1901 – January 1, 1968) was an Italian mathematician and antifascist.

== Biography ==
Morin was born in Trieste in 1901. His family was originally from Mali Lošinj. He obtained his first degree at the University of Padova in 1926; in 1933 he was a lecturer in geometry. In 1935 he became a professor at the University of Padova, and from 1942 to 1945 he taught at the University of Florence (analytical geometry). From 1946 he was again a professor in Padova, where he died in 1968. He was also the author of many scientific articles about classical algebraic geometry and abstract algebra.

While working in Florence, he was an active antifascist: he organized the Partito d’Azione and its militia, participated in the Resistance, organized the clandestine Partito d’Azione and Giustizia e Libertà; in 1945 he was chairman of the Tuscan CLN (National Liberation Committee).
