= Luigi Sante Da Rios =

Italian physicist and mathematician (1881–1965)

Luigi Sante Da Rios (Santa Lucia di Piave, 2 April 1881 – Padova, 1965) was an Italian mathematician and physicist who worked on fluid dynamics. In his 1906 work "Sul moto d'un liquido indefinito con un filetto vorticoso di forma qualunque" (On the motion of a generic fluid with a vortex filament of arbitrary shape), he presented the basic equations for the vortex filament model, today used to simulate quantised vortex lines in superfluids.

From 1938 to 1944 he held the course of Analytical Mechanics at Istituto superiore di Architettura in Venice (today known as IUAV). In 1944 he was removed from this position, probably due to his anti fascist political views.
