= Ovidio =

Ovidio is a given name. Notable people with the name include:

- Ovidio G. Assonitis (born 1943), independent film producer and businessman
- Ovidio Cervi of the Cervi Brothers, the seven sons of Alcide Cervi and Genoveffa Cocconi
- Gabriel Ovidio Curuchet (born 1963), retired road bicycle racer and track cyclist from Argentina
- Ovidio García (born 1968), Spanish former alpine skier who competed in the 1992 and 1994 Winter Olympics
- Dorian Ovidio Guachalla (born 1977), Bolivian male former volleyball player
- Ovidio Guaita, journalist, photographer and traveller
- Francisco Ovidio Vera Intriago (1941–2014), Roman Catholic bishop
- Ovidio de Jesús (1933–2011), Puerto Rican sprinter
- Ovidio Lagos (1825–1891), Argentine journalist, businessman and politician
- Ovidio Lari (1919–2007), Italian prelate of the Catholic Church and the Bishop of Aosta
- Ovídio Martins (1928–1999), famous Cape Verdean poet and journalist
- Santo Ovídio, Portuguese saint
- Ovídio Manuel Barbosa Pequeno (born 1954), São Toméan diplomat, who served as Minister of Foreign Affairs on two occasions
- Ovidio Cortázar Ramos (born 1962), Mexican politician from the National Action Party

== See also ==
- Ovid
- Ovidio Lagos Avenue, a street in Rosario, Santa Fe Province, Argentina
- Ophidia
- Ovadia
- Ovidia
- Ovidie
- Ovidiopol
- Ovidiu
- Oviedo
