= Giulio Vivanti =

Italian mathematician (1859–1949)

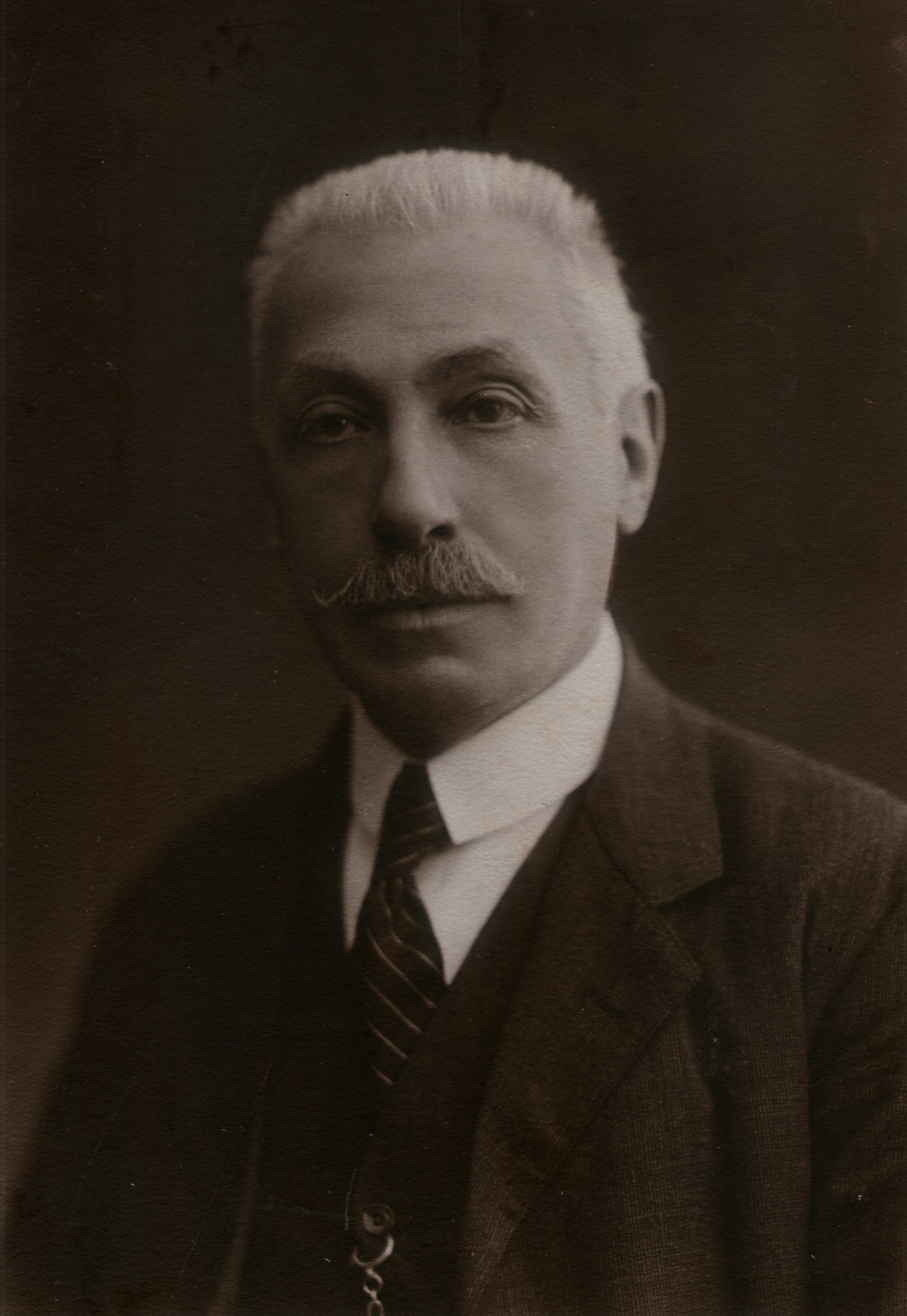
- Born: 24 May 1859; Mantua, Kingdom of Lombardy–Venetia
- Died: 19 November 1949 (aged 90); Milan, Italy
- Education: University of Bologna; University of Turin
- Scientific career
- Fields: Mathematics
- Workplaces: University of Milan

Giulio Benedetto Isacco Vivanti (24 May 1859 – 19 November 1949) was an Italian Jewish mathematician. He was a mentor of Bruno de Finetti and he spent most of his academic career at the University of Pavia and University of Milan.

== See also ==
- Vivanti–Pringsheim theorem
