= Paolo Ruffini =

Italian mathematician and philosopher (1765–1822)

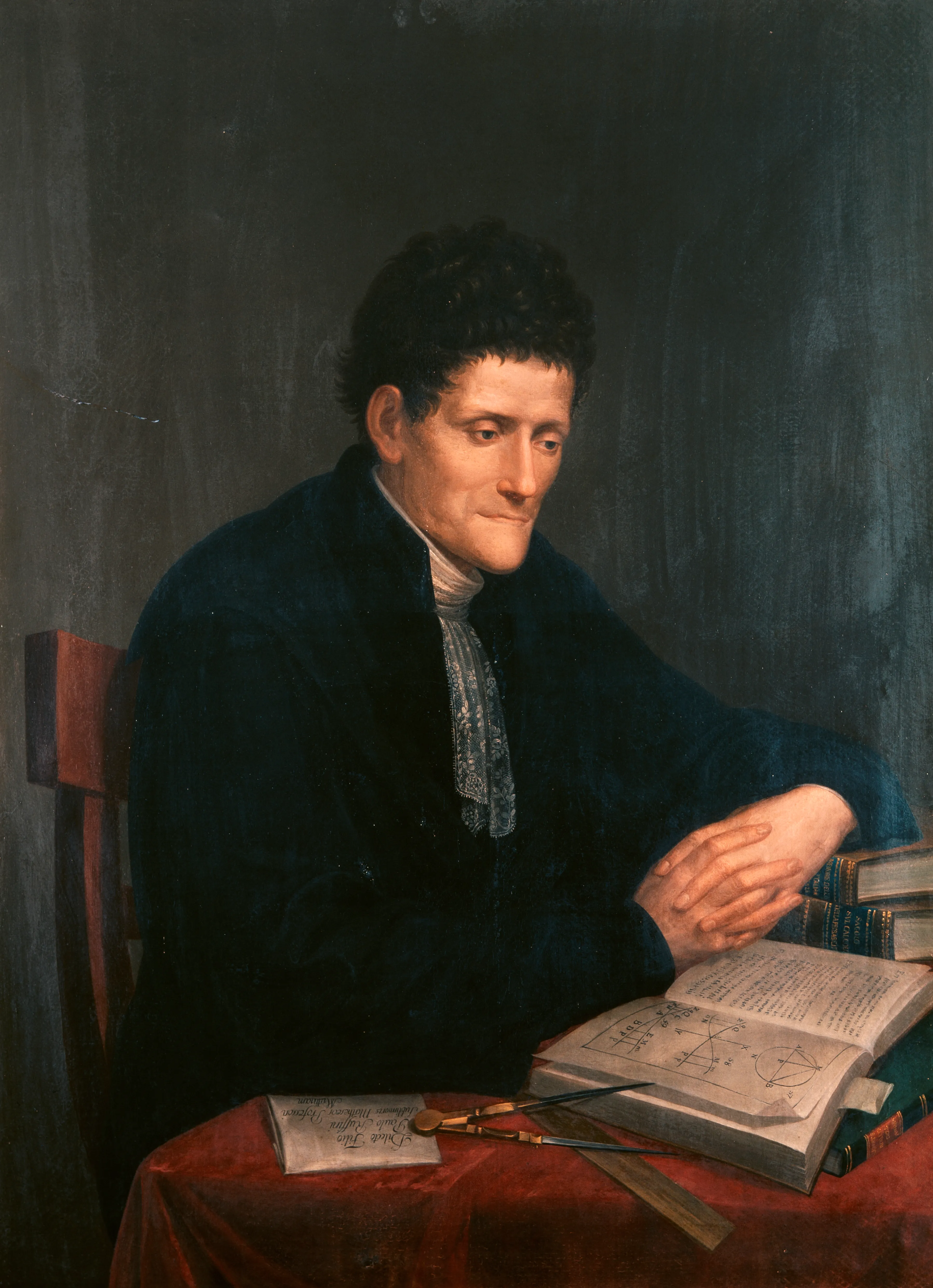
- Portrait of Paolo Ruffini by Biagio Magnanini, Modena, University of Modena and Reggio Emilia
- Born: 22 September 1765; Valentano, Papal States (now in Italy)
- Died: 10 May 1822 (aged 56); Modena, Duchy of Modena and Reggio (now in Italy)
- Resting place: Santa Maria della Pomposa, Modena
- Education: University of Modena
- Known for: Abel–Ruffini theorem Ruffini's rule Work on group theory
- Scientific career
- Fields: Mathematics
- Workplaces: University of Modena
- Doctoral advisor: Paolo Cassiani; Luigi Fantini; Giovanni Battista Venturi
- Notable students: Giovanni Battista Amici

President of the Accademia nazionale delle scienze
- In office 3 September 1816 – 10 May 1822
- Preceded by: Antonio Cagnoli
- Succeeded by: Luigi Rangoni

Signature
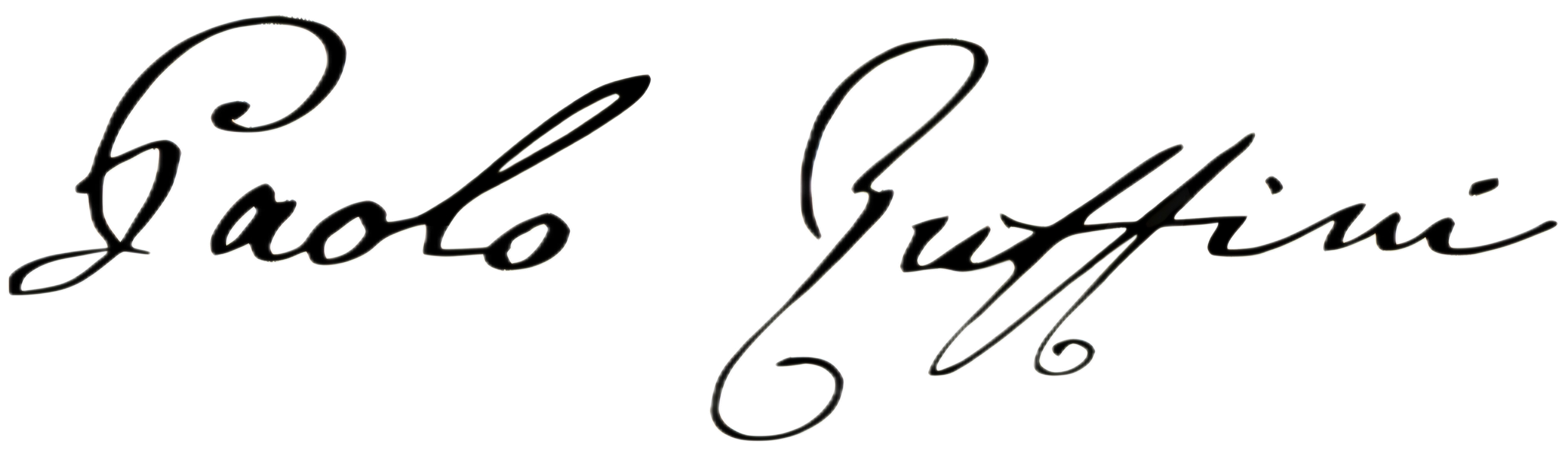

Paolo Ruffini (22 September 1765 – 10 May 1822) was an Italian mathematician and philosopher. Remembered chiefly for what is now known as the Abel–Ruffini theorem, Ruffini also made a major contribution to the theory of equations, developing the so-called theory of substitutions, the forerunner of modern group theory.

== Biography ==
=== Early life and education ===
Paolo Ruffini was born in 1765 in Valentano in the Papal States, to a middle-class family. His father, Basilio, was a physician. When Paolo was a teenager his family moved to Reggio Emilia, near Modena. As a young boy he intended to enter Holy orders and went so far as to receive the tonsure, but he later changed his mind. He enrolled in the University of Modena, where he studied literature, medicine, mathematics, and philosophy. Among his teachers of mathematics at Modena were Luigi Fantini, Paolo Cassiani and Giovanni Battista Venturi. In 1788, he was awarded a degree in philosophy, medicine, and surgery, and in 1789, he added a mathematics degree. In 1791, he received his license to practice medicine.

=== Career ===
When only 23 years of age, Ruffini was elected Professor of Mathematics at the University of Modena. In 1780, he was elected a member of the National Academy of Sciences, the so-called "Society of the Forty". A conservative Catholic, Ruffini lost his position at the University during the French invasion of Italy because he would not take the oath of allegiance to the new government. Barred from teaching, he devoted himself to medicine and mathematical research.

In 1799, he published a revolutionary and highly controversial theory of equations claiming that quintics could not be solved by radicals, as leading mathematicians had believed at the time. Ruffini was the first to introduce the notion of the order of an element, conjugacy, the cycle decomposition of elements of permutation groups, and the notions of primitive and imprimitive.

Like other great minds, ahead of their time, his mathematical contemporaries could not accept his revolutionary idea that a polynomial could not be solved in radicals. Niels Henrik Abel is sometimes incorrectly credited with Ruffini's ideas, since Ruffini was dismissed by peers who did not accept his theories into the mainstream mathematics of the time. Lagrange, while finding Ruffini's work impressive, hesitated to accept such a revolutionary concept. The first mathematician who recognised the importance of Ruffini's work was Augustin Cauchy, who generalised some of his results from 1813 to 1815. Ruffini's work became widely recognized at the end of the nineteenth century, thanks to contributions by scholars like Burkhardt and Pierpont.

=== Later life ===
In 1804 Ruffini won a gold medal offered by the Società Italiana delle Scienze for the best method of determining the roots of a numerical equation of any degree, the famous Ruffini's rule. After the defeat of Napoleon in 1814, Ruffini returned to the University of Modena as rector, in addition to holding professorships in mathematics and medicine. In 1816 he succeeded Antonio Cagnoli as president of the National Academy of Sciences. Ruffini contracted severe typhoid fever while aiding victims of the 1817-18 typhus epidemic and never fully recovered. He died on 10 May 1822 in Modena and was buried in the Church of Santa Maria della Pomposa, between the tombs of Sigonius and Muratori. An accomplished physician, Ruffini also published scientific treatises on typhus based on his own experience with the disease in 1820. His mathematical works were edited by Ettore Bortolotti and published in 1915 by the Italian Mathematical Union.

== Contributions to mathematics ==
Ruffini's works include notable developments in algebra. His most important accomplishment is the proof that that quintic (and higher-order) equations cannot be solved by radicals (Abel–Ruffini theorem). While his initial proof in 1799 was incomplete, it laid the foundation for the later work of Niels Henrik Abel, who provided a complete proof in 1824.

Ruffini is also well known for the Ruffini's rule, a quick method to divide polynomials by linear factors. Described by Ruffini in a paper published in 1804, this rule was a significant contribution to the field of algebra and remains a valuable tool in polynomial manipulation. In a second paper published in 1813 Ruffini applies his method to the extraction of roots of numbers and gives in full several illustrations of the process. He explains also how the process may be contracted. Thereupon he proceeds to a derivation of his method of solution by elementary processes, without the use of the differential calculus.

Ruffini also marked a major improvement for group theory, developing Joseph-Louis Lagrange's work on permutation theory (Réflexions sur la théorie algébrique des équations, 1770–1771). Lagrange's work was largely ignored until Ruffini established strong connections between permutations and the solvability of algebraic equations. Ruffini introduced notions like the order of an element, conjugacy, and cycle decomposition in permutation groups, making him a pioneer in this field. He was also the first to distinguish between transitive and intransitive permutation groups, and among the transitive permutation groups between primitive and imprimitive.

Ruffini also wrote on probability and the quadrature of the circle. In his later years he wrote several articles and books on epistemological and philosophical topics considered from a Catholic perspective. In his essay The immateriality of the soul (Immaterialità dell’anima), published in 1806, he opposed Erasmus Darwin's philosophical system, while in his Riflessioni critiche (1821) he refuted Pierre-Simon Laplace’s Essai philosophique sur les probabilités (1812).

== Legacy ==
Ruffini's proof was initially received with skepticism by the mathematical community. Particularly strong objections against Ruffini's work were raised by Gian Francesco Malfatti and Gregorio Fontana. In a number of papers published between 1802 and 1806 Ruffini refined and completed his proof, answering the objections raised by Malfatti and Fontana and adopting some suggestions of Pietro Abbati Marescotti. In his paper Riflessione intorno alla soluzione delle equazioni algebraiche generali, published in 1813, Ruffini gave a different demonstration of his theorem that largely coincides with what is now called Wantzel's modification of the theorem of Ruffini–Abel.

Only later in Ruffini’s life his proof was recognized as fundamentally correct and built upon by mathematicians like Cauchy, Abel and Galois. Ruffini's insights into the structure of permutation groups were crucial for understanding the limitations of algebraic solutions.

== Publications ==
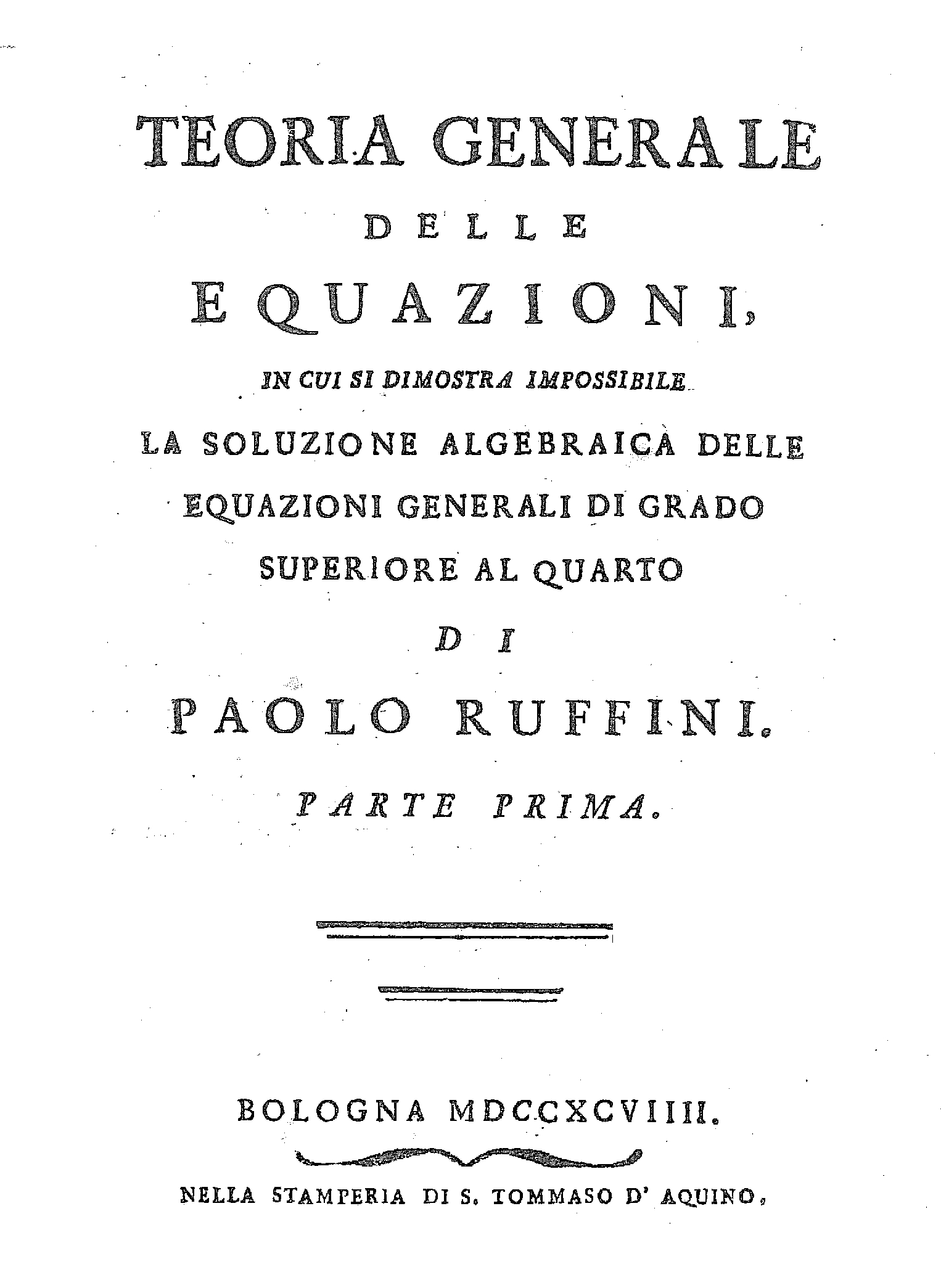
Teoria generale delle equazioni, 1799

- 1799: Teoria Generale delle Equazioni, in cui si dimostra impossibile la soluzione algebraica delle equazioni generali di grado superiore al quarto ("General Theory of equations, in which the algebraic solution of general equations of degree higher than four is proven impossible")
- 1802: Riflessioni intorno alla rettificazione ed alla quadratura del circulo ("Reflections on the rectification and the squaring of the circle")
- 1802: Della soluzione delle equazioni algebraiche determinate particolari di grado superiore al quarto ("On the solution of certain determined algebraic equations of degree higher than four")
- 1804: Sopra la determinazione delle radici nelle equazioni numeriche di qualunque grado ("About the determination of the roots in the numerical equations of any degree")
- 1806: Della immortalità dell’anima ("On the immortality of the soul")
- 1807: Algebra elementare ("Elementary algebra")
- 1813: Riflessioni intorno alla soluzione delle equazioni algebraiche generali ("Reflections on the algebraic solutions of equations")
- 1820: Memoria sul tifo contagioso ("Essay on contagious typhoid")
- 1821: Riflessioni critiche sopra il saggio filosofico intorno alle probabilità del signor conte Laplace ("Critical reflections on the philosophical essay about probability by Count Laplace")

== See also ==
- 8524 Paoloruffini, asteroid named after him

== Bibliography ==
- Smith, David Eugene (1906), History of Modern Mathematics, Mathematical Monographs, No. 1, archived from the original on 29 January 2021
- Burkhardt, Heinrich (1892). "Die Anfänge der Gruppentheorie und Paolo Ruffini". Zeitschrift für Mathematik und Physik. 37: 119–159.
- This article incorporates text from a publication now in the public domain: Herbermann, Charles, ed. (1913). "Paolo Ruffini". Catholic Encyclopedia. New York: Robert Appleton Company.
- Bortolotti, Ettore (1936). "RUFFINI, Paolo". Enciclopedia Italiana. Rome: Istituto dell'Enciclopedia Italiana.
- Barbensi, Gustavo (1955). Paolo Ruffini nel suo tempo. Modena: Accademia Nazionale di Scienze Lettere e Arti.
- Ayoub, Raymond G. (1980). "Paolo Ruffini's Contributions to the Quintic". Archive for History of Exact Sciences. 23 (3): 253–77. JSTOR 41133596.
- Bryce, R. A. (1986). "Paolo Ruffini and the quintic equation". Symposia Mathematica. 27: 169–185.
- Cassinet, Jean (1988). "Paolo Ruffini (1765-1822): la résolution algébrique des équations et les groupes de permutations". Bollettino di Storia delle Scienze Matematiche. 1: 21–69.
- Franci, Raffaella (1992). "L'algebra in Italia dal 1799 al 1813". Physis. 29: 745–70.
- Toti Rigatelli, L. (1994). "The theory of equations from Cardano to Galois 1540–1830". In I. Grattan-Guinness (ed.). Companion Encyclopedia of the History and Philosophy of the Mathematical Sciences. Vol. 1. London: Routledge. pp. 713–721.
- Barbieri, F.; Fiori, C. (1995). "Paolo Ruffini all'Università di Modena". Atti del Convegno di studi in memoria di Giuseppe Gemignani, Modena (20 maggio 1994). Modena: Mucchi. pp. 93–119.
- Pesic, Peter (2004). Abel's Proof: An Essay on the Sources and Meaning of Mathematical Unsolvability. Cambridge, MA: MIT Press. ISBN 978-0262661829.
- Livio, Mario (2005). The Equation that Couldn't Be Solved: How Mathematical Genius Discovered the Language of Symmetry. Simon and Schuster. ISBN 9780743274623.
- Barbieri, Francesco; Degani, Franca Cattelani (2013). "Ruffini, Paolo". Il Contributo italiano alla storia del Pensiero: Scienze. Rome: Istituto dell'Enciclopedia Italiana.
- Strick, Heinz Klaus (1 October 2015). "Paolo Ruffini (1765 – 1822), italienischer Pionier der Gruppentheorie". Spektrum.de (in German).
- O'Connor, John J.; Robertson, Edmund F., "Paolo Ruffini", MacTutor History of Mathematics Archive, University of St Andrews
