= La Specola, Padua =

Coordinates: 45.401879°N 11.868568°E

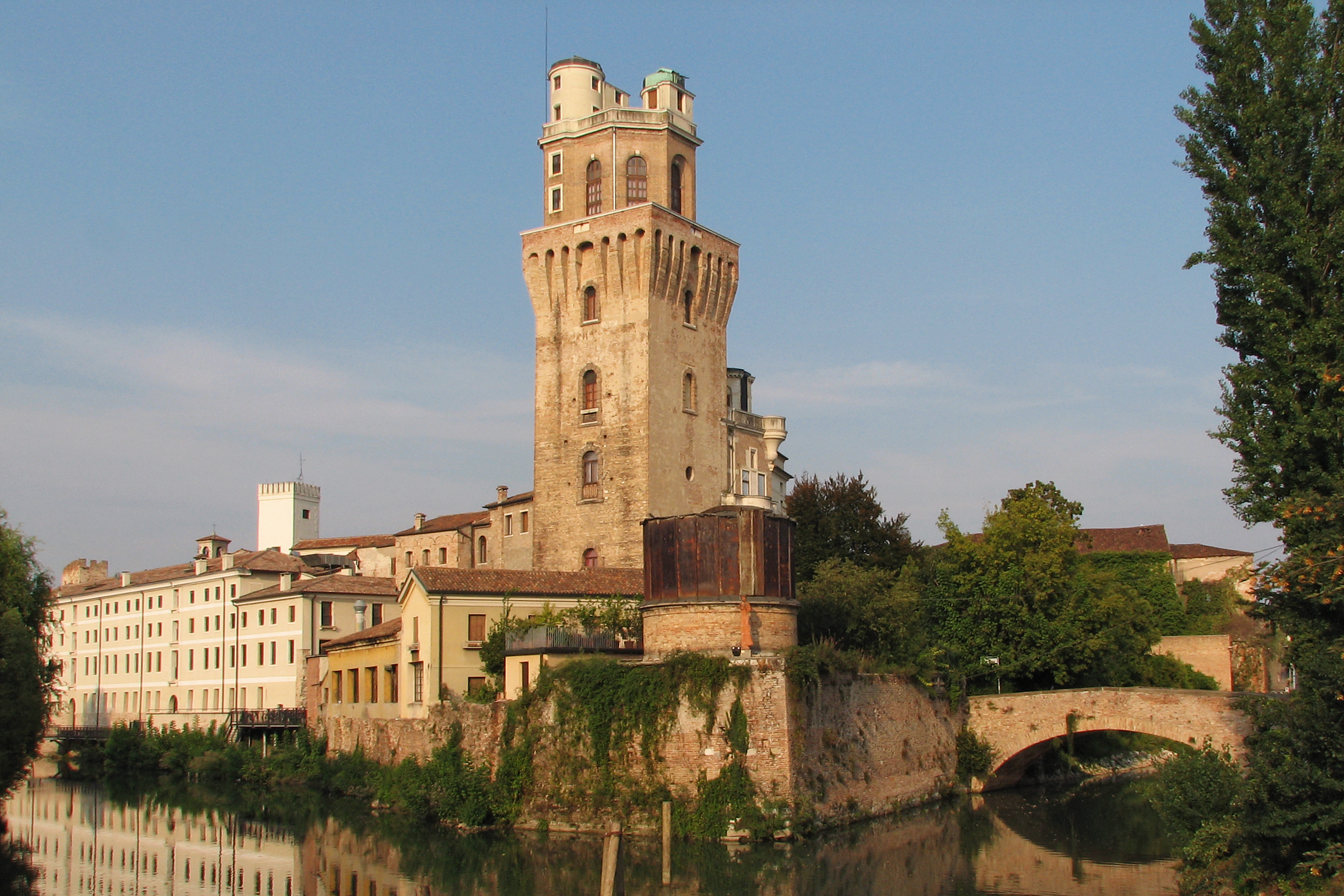
View of La Specola

La Specola is a 14th-century tower, formerly part of a medieval castle, and converted in 1767 into an astronomical observatory (specula) in Padua, region of Veneto, Italy.

== History ==
The 13th-century ruler of Padua, Ezzelino III da Romano, had built a castle at the site; this tower had served as a dungeon. In the 14th century during a reconstruction by Francesco I da Carrara, this tower was raised further.

After its conversion to an astronomical observatory a decade before, in 1777 the tower housed a lower observatory, 16 metres above ground level, and an upper observatory at a height of 35 metres. The entrance has an inscription by Abbé Toaldo added in 1771, reflecting on the changed uses of the site:

1242 / This tower, which once led to infernal shadows/ now, under the auspices of the Venetians, opens the way to the stars / 1767

The lower observatory was named the Sala Meridiana; noon was measured on the meridian line sunk in the floor. The upper observatory has walls of eight metres, and its large windows are almost six metres high.

The observatory remained in use until the 1930s, when the University of Padua decided to procure a modern facility, represented by the Asiago Astrophysical Observatory on a plateau north of Padova, commissioned in 1942. La Specola museum has frescoes depicting famous astronomers and a collection of period astronomical instruments.

== See also ==
- List of astronomical observatories
