= Enea Bortolotti =

Italian mathematician (1896–1942)

- Born: 28 September 1896; Rome, Kingdom of Italy
- Died: 22 June 1942 (aged 45); Florence, Kingdom of Italy
- Education: Scuola Normale Superiore di Pisa
- Known for: Differential Geometry
- Scientific career
- Fields: Mathematics

Enea Bortolotti (28 September 1896 – 22 June 1942) was an Italian mathematician.

== Biography ==
He graduated in mathematics in 1920 at the University of Pisa, where he was a student of Luigi Bianchi. He taught analytic and descriptive geometry at the Universities of Cagliari and Florence. He was mainly involved in differential geometry: he was a specialist in the theory of linear connections.
