= Achille Sannia =

Italian mathematician and politician (1822–1892)

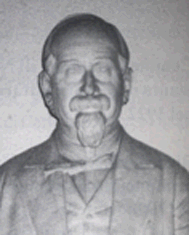
- Born: Campobasso
- Died: Naples
- Citizenship: Italian
- Known for: Geometry and Politics
- Awards: Great official of the Order of the Crown of Italy, Commendatore of the Order of Saints Maurizio and Lazzaro
- Scientific career
- Fields: Mathematics; Politics

Achille Sannia (14 April 1822 – 2 August 1892) was an Italian mathematician and politician.

== Biography ==
Achille Sannia was a senator of the Kingdom of Italy. He was born in Campobasso and later moved from Molise to Naples to continue his studies together with Enrico D'Ovidio. He first taught in a private school before moving to a University in 1865 as a professor of geometry.

In 1871, he created a school of electrical engineering. He wrote two important treatises, one concerning projective geometry and the other elementary geometry. He was a member of the Academy of Sciences.

He had a son, Gustavo Sannia, who was also a mathematician.

== Works ==
- Planimetry, with Enrico D'Ovidio, Stab. typ. of the fine arts, Naples 1869, II ed. 1871
- Geometry elements, with Enrico D'Ovidio, (14 editions), Naples 1868-69, 12th edition, B. Pellerano LC Scientific and Industrial Library successor, Naples 1906
- Projection Geometry Lessons dictated in the Royal University of Naples by Prof. Achille Sannia- Ed. Pellerano Naples 1891 of 691pagg.
