= Eugenio Bertini =

Italian mathematician (1846–1933)

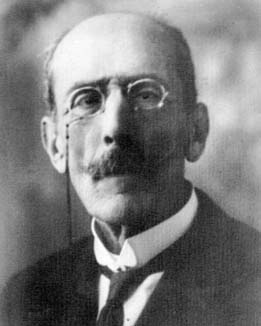
Eugenio Bertini

Eugenio Bertini (8 November 1846 – 24 February 1933) was an Italian mathematician who introduced Bertini's theorem. He was born at Forlì and died at Pisa, Italy.

== Selected works ==
- Sui poliedri euleriani. 1869.
- Introduzione alla geometria proiettiva degli iperspazi. E. Spoerri. 1907.
- Einführung in die projektive Geometrie mehrdimensionaler Räume. L. W. Seidel. 1924.
- Complementi di geometria proiettiva. N. Zanichelli. 1927.
