= Giovanni Battista Venturi =

Italian physicist, savant, man of letters, diplomat and historian of science

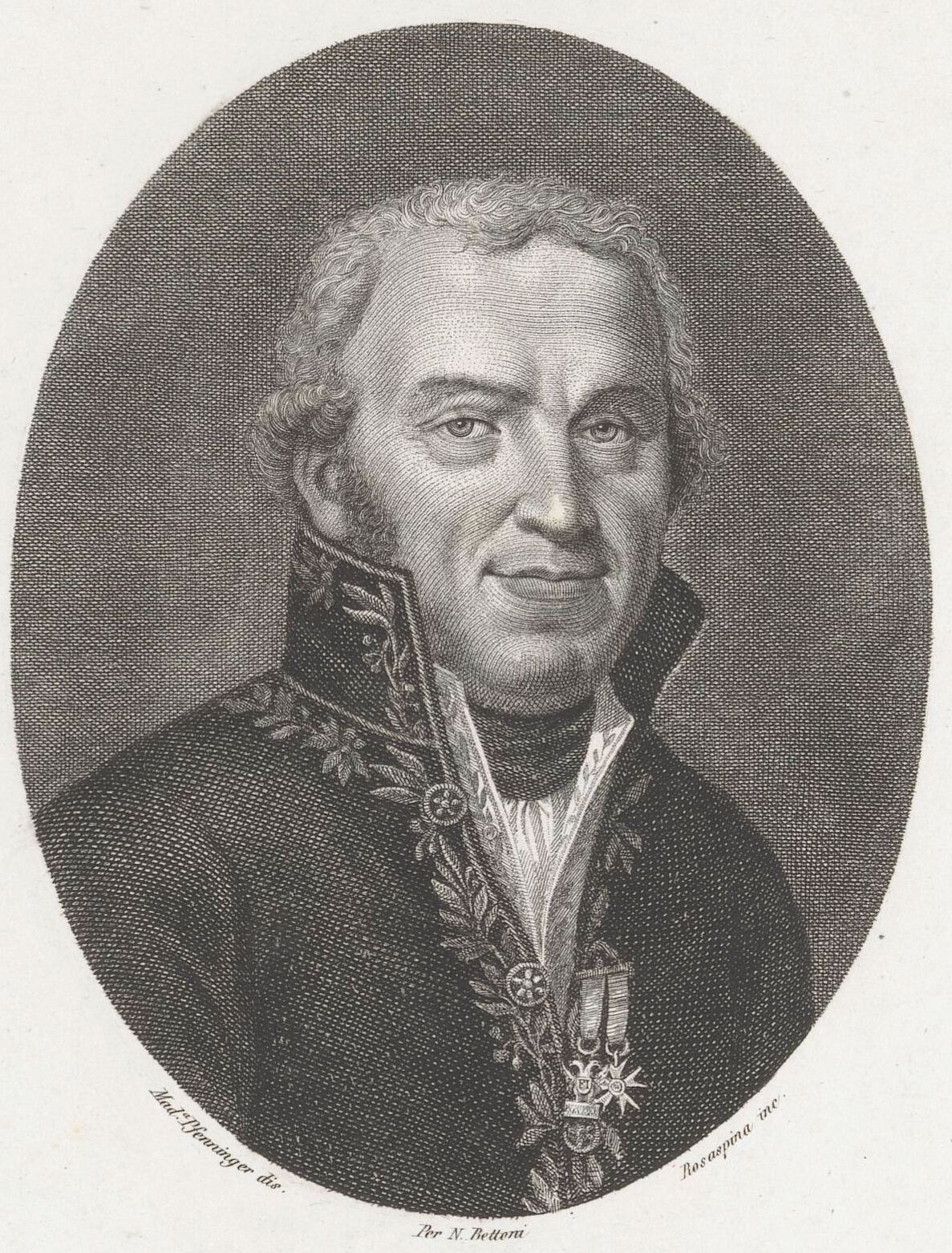
- Giovanni Battista Venturi
- Born: 11 September 1746; Bibbiano, Papal States
- Died: 10 September 1822 (aged 75); Reggio Emilia, Papal States
- Occupation: Physicist
- Employer: University of Modena and Reggio Emilia
- Known for: Venturi effect

Signature
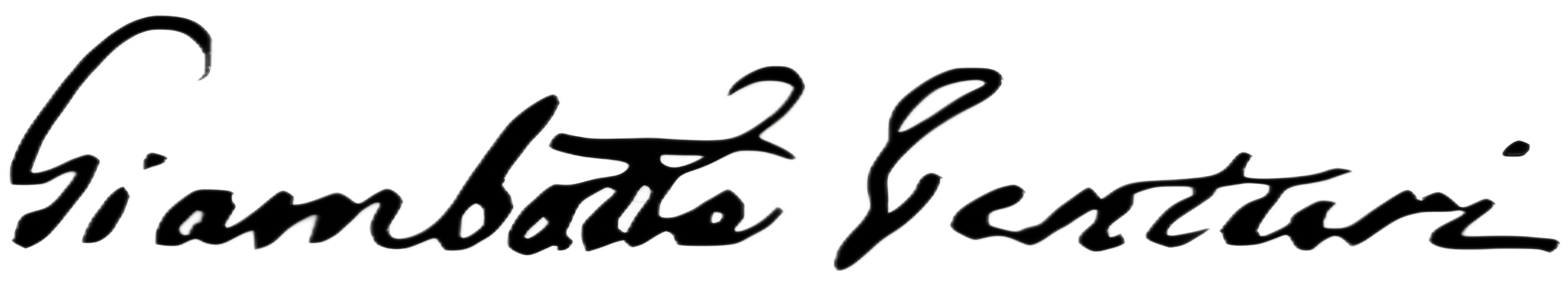

Giovanni Battista Venturi (11 September 1746 – 10 September 1822) was an Italian physicist, Catholic priest, savant, man of letters, diplomat and historian of science. He was the discoverer of the Venturi effect, which was described in 1797 in his Recherches Experimentales sur le Principe de la Communication Laterale du Mouvement dans les Fluides appliqué a l'Explication de Differens Phenomènes Hydrauliques, translated into English by William Nicholson as "Experimental Inquiries Concerning the Principle of the Lateral Communication of a Motion in Fluids," and published in 1836 in Thomas Tredgold's Tracts on Hydraulics. Because of this discovery, he is the eponym for the Venturi effect, Venturi tube, Venturi flow meter, and the Venturi pump.

== Career ==
Born in Bibbiano, Italy, in the Province of Reggio Emilia, Giovanni was a contemporary of Lagrange and Laplace, and a pupil of Lazzaro Spallanzani. He was ordained as a priest in 1769, at the age of 23, and in the same year was appointed as teacher of logic at the seminary of Reggio Emilia, where he had earlier received an education. In 1774 he became a professor of geometry and philosophy at the University of Modena. He later held the posts of ducal mathematician, state engineer, and auditor under the Duke of Modena. As state engineer he was responsible for bridge construction, rectification of water courses, draining of marsh land, and the establishment of State regulations for dam construction. In 1786 he was given the post of professor of experimental physics at the University of Modena, where he organized a laboratory, equipping it with state-of-the-art equipment. During this time he was also able to complete the town of Modena's historical memoirs, which had been left incomplete following the death of Girolamo Tiraboschi, the appointed historian.

== Fluid mechanics ==
Venturi effect: the pressure in the first measuring tube (1) is higher than at the second (2), and the fluid speed at "1" is lower than at "2", because the cross-sectional area at "1" is greater than at "2".

Venturi moved to Paris as Secretary of a delegation sent by the Duke of Modena to undertake negotiations with the Supreme Executive Council. Following unsuccessful negotiations, he remained in there for a year and a half to improve his knowledge of physics and chemistry. While in Paris, he came into contact with some of the most learned scholars of the age, such as Georges Cuvier, René Just Haüy, Jean-Baptiste Biot, Jérôme Lalande, Gaspard Monge, Pierre-Simon Laplace, and many more. He also published several treatises, including the famous "Venturi effect" treatise of 1797. However, Venturi's design was not applied to a practical apparatus until 1888, when Clemens Herschel was awarded a patent for the first commercial model of a Venturi tube. This was followed in 1926 by Cecil Aggeler's bachelor's thesis, "Design of a Venturi Type Current Meter."

== Historian of science ==
Another of Venturi's treatises demonstrated his abilities as a historian of science. He was the first to call attention to the importance of Leonardo da Vinci as a scientist, rather than simply as an artist, in the 1797 booklet, Essai sur les ouvrages physico-mathématiques de Léonard de Vinci. He has also worked on hydraulics with him. They were considered to be the first to study tribology.

Jérôme Lalande, director of the Paris Observatory, commended Venturi to General Napoleon Bonaparte as "one of the men most competent to bring renown to Italy and to build there useful waterworks and do good work in mathematics and physics," and praised his ability in the art of civil engineering and military architecture. The Abbé Venturi used Napoleon's influence and protection to frustrate the intrigues of those in his country who tried to oust him from his position at the university. Bonaparte made him a member of the Corps législatif, professor at the Military School of Modena, and Chevalier of the Legion of Honour. Adverse political influences subjected Venturi to many vicissitudes, even leading to imprisonment. But after the conquest of Italy, the First Consul Napoleon gave him a professorship at the University of Pavia, and he was assigned several diplomatic missions. Venturi also continued to apply his engineering expertise in mine work and hydraulic construction.

Flow in a Venturi tube

Later, he was made diplomatic agent of the Helvetic Confederation, and spent twelve years in Switzerland. He retired in 1813, due to failing health, and was granted a pension on the maximum scale by the Emperor Napoleon. On his return to Reggio he set about the publication of a number of scientific and literary works. In 1814 Venturi wrote Commentari sopra la storia e le teorie dell' ottica (Commentaries about the history and theory of optics), which included Hero of Alexandria's treatise on the dioptra and from 1818 to 1821 he compiled, edited and published many of Galileo's manuscripts and letters in Memorie e lettere inedite finora o disperse di Galileo Galilei, ordinate e illustrate con annotazioni. He was also the first author who acknowledged Leonardo da Vinci's work on tribology, publishing a commentary on some Leonardo's notebooks, written between 1493-4 and 1515, which have been transferred from the Ambrosian Library in Milan to Paris after the Napoleon’s conquest of northern Italy.

Venturi died at Reggio Emilia in September 1822, at the age of seventy-five.

== Works ==
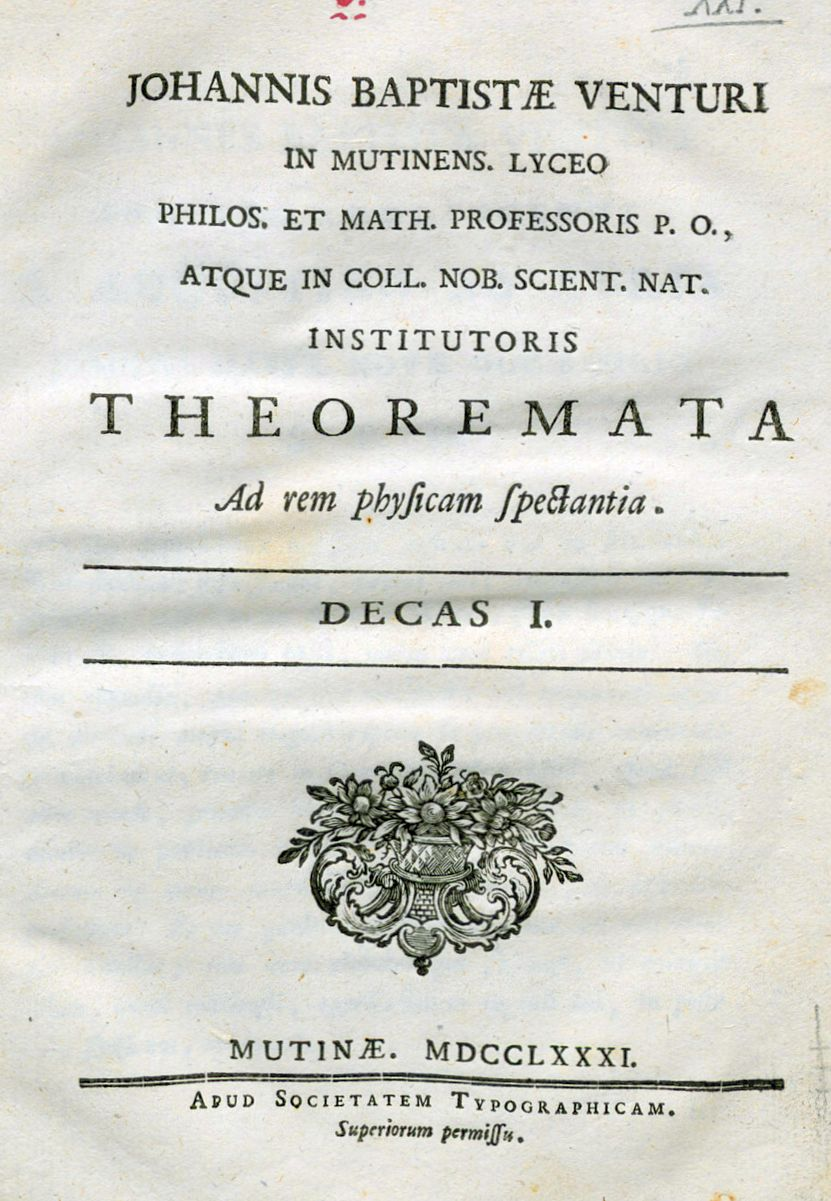
Theoremata ad rem physicam spectantia, 1781

- Theoremata ad rem physicam spectantia (in Latin). Modena: Società tipografica. 1781.
- Rapporto sopra il nuovo campione di misura lineare (in Italian). Milano: Tipografia nazionale. 1797.
- Essai sur les ouvrages physico-mathématiques de Leonardo de Vinci, avec des fragmens tirés de ses manuscrits, apportés de l'Italie [Essay on the physical-mathematical works of Leonardo da Vinci, with extracts from the manuscripts brought from Italy] (in French). Paris: Duprat. 1797.
- Venturi, J.B. (1797). Recherches Experimentales sur le Principe de la Communication Laterale du Mouvement dans les Fluides appliqué a l'Explication de Differens Phenomènes Hydrauliques [Experimental investigations into the principle of the lateral communication of the movement in fluids applied to the explanation of different hydraulic phenomena] (in French). Paris, France: Houel et Ducros and Théophile Barrois.
  - Venturi, J.B. with William Nicholson, trans. (1799) "Experimental researches concerning the principle of the lateral communication of motion in fluids, applied to the explanation of various hydraulic phenomena," Journal of Natural Philosophy, Chemistry and the Arts, vol. 2: 172–179, 273–276, 422–426, 487–494; vol. 3: 13–22, 59–61.
  - Venturi, J.B.; Nicholson, William, trans. (1836). "Experimental researches concerning the principle of the lateral communication of motion in fluids, applied to the explanation of various hydraulic phenomena". In Tredgold, Thomas (ed.). Tracts on Hydraulics. London, England: M. Taylor. pp. 123–184.

== See also ==
- Fluid mechanics
- Hydraulics
