= Vittorio Fossombroni =

Italian statesman, mathematician, and engineer (1754–1844)

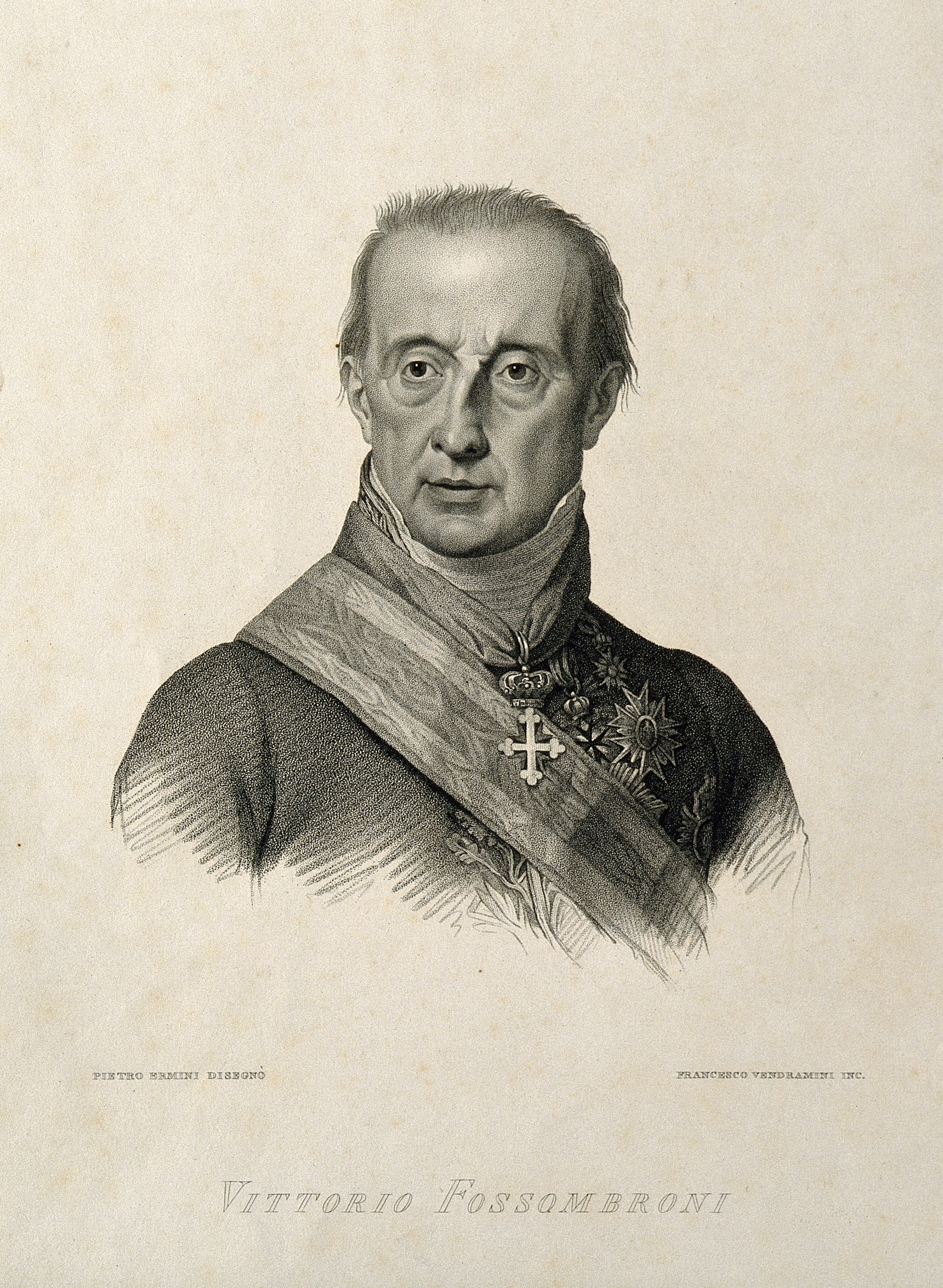
- Born: 15 September 1754; Arezzo, Italy
- Died: 13 April 1844 (aged 89); Florence, Italy
- Education: University of Pisa
- Occupation(s): Statesman, Mathematician, Economist, Drainage engineer
- Known for: Direction of drainage works in Valdichiana, Minister for Foreign Affairs of Tuscany, Prime Minister under Grand Duke Leopold II
- Notable work: Treatise on the drainage of Valdichiana (1789)
- Children: Enrico Vittorio Fossombroni

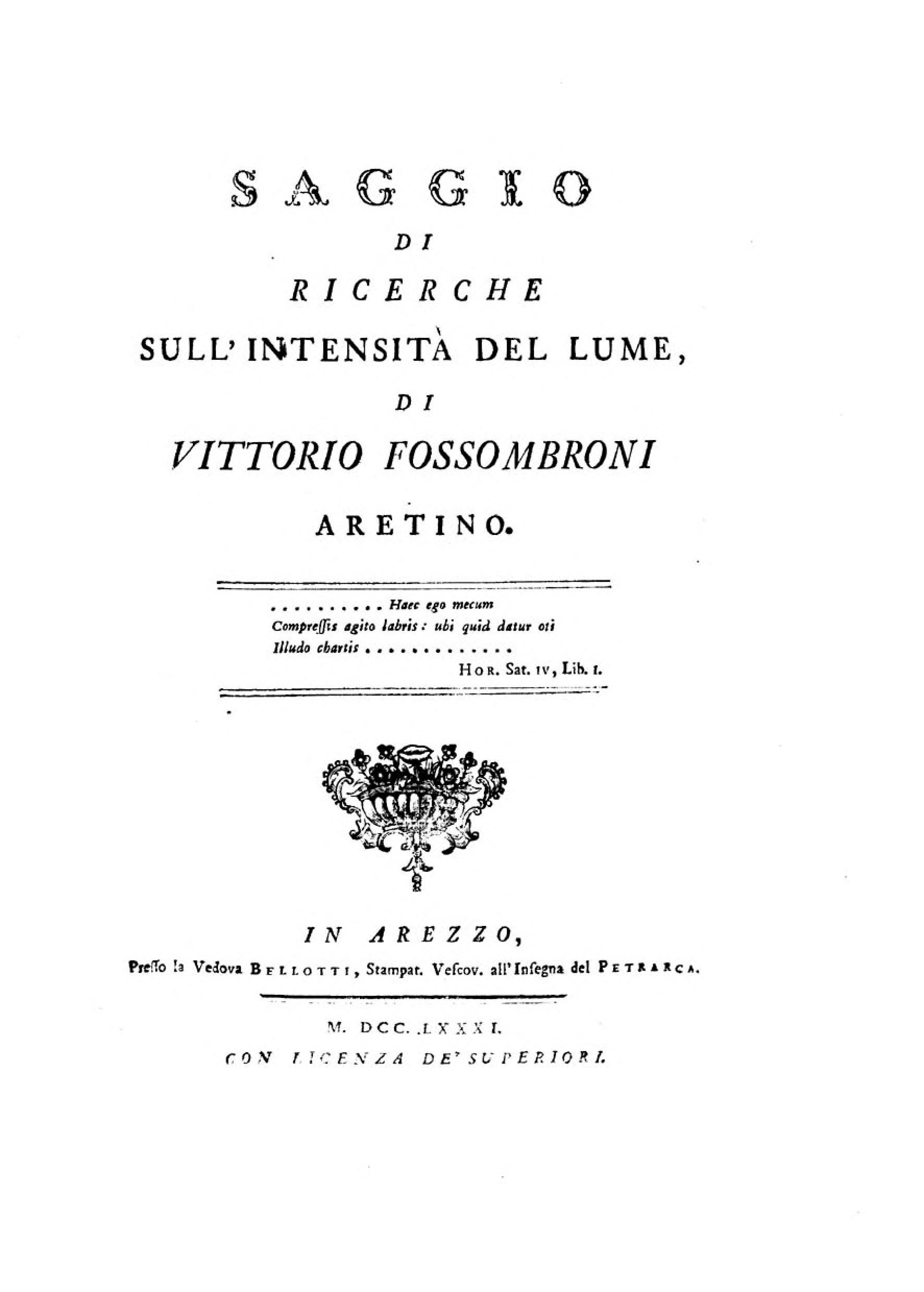
Saggio, 1781

Vittorio Fossombroni (15 September 1754 – 13 April 1844) was an Italian statesman, mathematician, economist and a distinguished drainage engineer.

== Biography ==
Fossombroni was born at Arezzo. He was educated at the University of Pisa, where he devoted himself particularly to mathematics and hydraulics. He obtained an official appointment in Tuscany in 1782, and twelve years later was entrusted by the grand duke with the direction of the works for the drainage of the marshy Valdichiana, one of the four valleys around Arezzo, on which subject he had published a treatise in 1789.

In 1796 he was made minister for foreign affairs, but on the French occupation of Tuscany in 1799 he fled to Sicily. On the erection of the grand duchy into the ephemeral Kingdom of Etruria, under the queen-regent Maria Louise, he was, appointed president of the commission of finance. In 1809 he went to Paris as one of the senators for Tuscany to pay homage to Napoleon.

On the restoration of the Grand Duke Ferdinand III in 1814, he was made president of the legislative commission and was appointed prime minister, a position he retained under the Grand Duke Leopold II. He was an important representative of the Italian School of virtual work laws. When he was prime minister, he pursued a policy of laissez-faire and international free trade.

According to Luigi Villaris, writing in the Encyclopædia Britannica Eleventh Edition: "His administration, which was only terminated by his death, greatly contributed to promote the well-being of the country. He was the real master of Tuscany, and the bases of his rule were equality of all subjects before the law, honesty in the administration of justice and toleration of opinion, but he totally neglected the moral improvement of the people."

Fossombroni married at the age of seventy-eight. His son Enrico Vittorio Fossombroni was a Senator in the Kingdom of Italy.

Vittorio Fossombroni died at Florence in 1844.

== Works ==
- Saggio di un dilettante di matematica sulle equazioni di condizione e sopra l'invenzione della brachistocrona. 1791.
- Saggio di ricerche sull'intensità del lume. in Arezzo: presso la vedova Bellotti. 1781.
- Memoria sul principio delle velocità virtuali. in Firenze: per Gaetano Cambiagi stampatore granducale. 1791.
- Memorie idraulico-storiche sopra la Val di Chiana. Firenze: per Gaetano Cambiagi. 1789.
