= Michelangelo Fardella =

Italian scientist and mathematician (1650–1718)

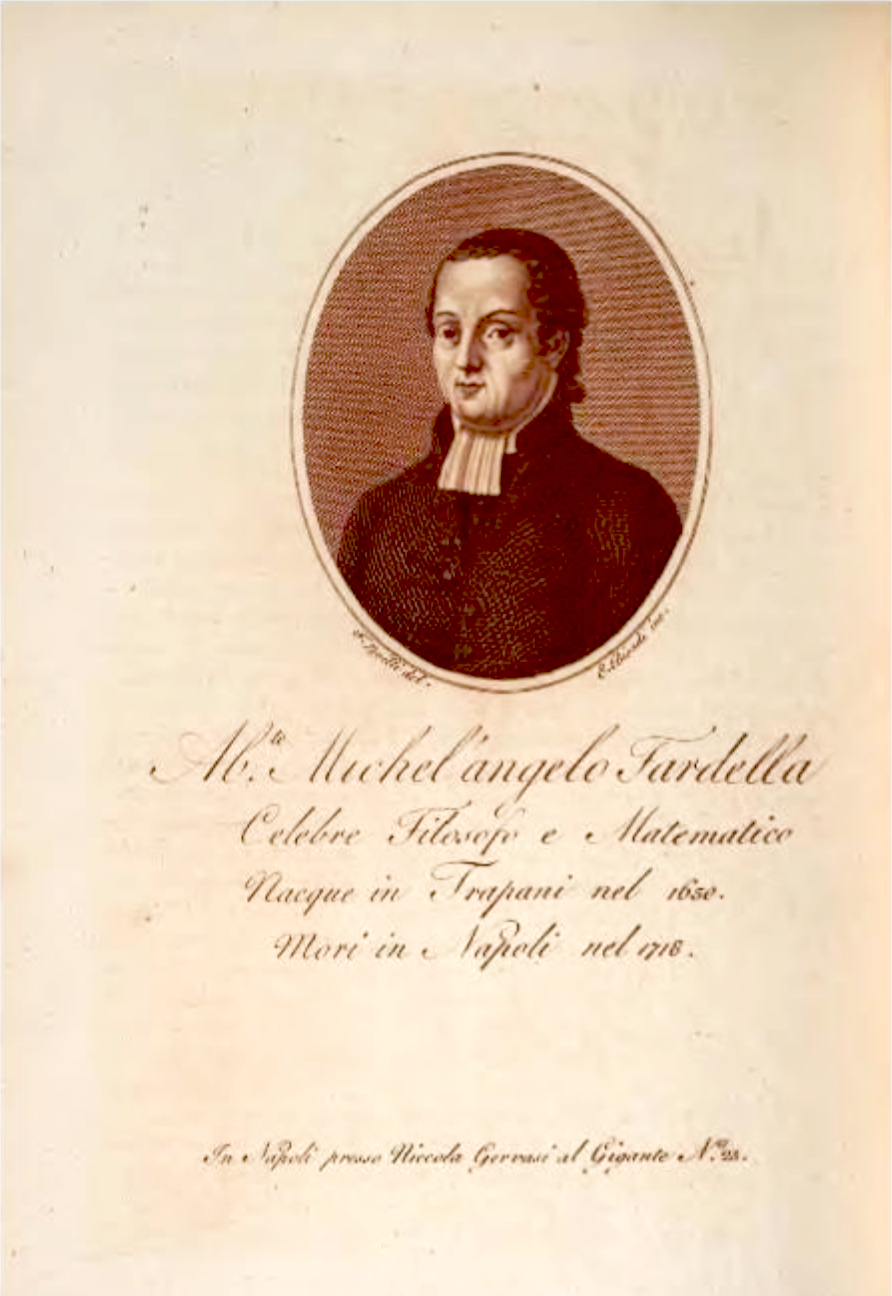
Portrait of Michelangelo Fardella

Michelangelo Fardella (born Trapani, 1650 – died Naples, January 2, 1718) was an Italian philosopher and mathematician.

== Biography ==
Fardella was born at Trapani, Sicily in 1650. He was greatly influenced by Giovanni Alfonso Borelli whom he met in Messina. Borelli introduced Fardella to experimental philosophy which shaped his intellectual development. He taught mathematics and philosophy in several different cities in Italy, Spain, and France. While in Paris he was influenced by Cartesianism. Fardella was a supporter of the dream argument. He was a follower of Nicolas Malebranche and interpreted René Descartes through the lens of Augustinianism.

Fardella was a member of the Franciscans, but was influenced by Lutheranism and because of this was brought before the Venetian Holy Inquisition in 1689. His most influential works were Universae philosophiae systema (1691); Universae usualis mathematicae theoria (1691); and Animae humanae natura ab Augustino detecta (1698). In the latter of these works he adopted principles from Gottfried Wilhelm Leibniz's Monadology.

He died in Naples in 1718.
