= Ettore Bortolotti =

Italian mathematician (1866–1947)

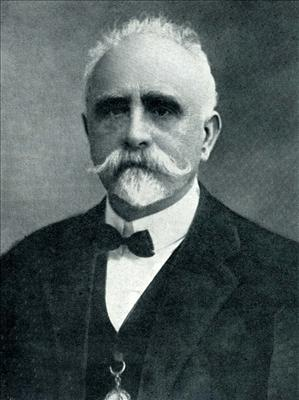
- Born: 6 March 1866; Bologna
- Died: 17 February 1947 (aged 80); Bologna
- Education: University of Bologna
- Scientific career
- Fields: Mathematics
- Doctoral advisor: Salvatore Pincherle

Ettore Bortolotti (6 March 1866 – 17 February 1947) was an Italian mathematician.

== Biography ==
Bortolotti was born in Bologna. He studied mathematics under Salvatore Pincherle and Cesare Arzelà in Bologna. He graduated in mathematics in 1889 at the University of Bologna, under Pincherle. He was appointed as lecturer to the Lyceum of Modica in Sicily in 1891, then studied for one year in Paris as a post-graduate, before lecturing at the University of Rome in 1893.

In 1900, he became a professor of infinitesimal calculus at Modena. There, he became dean from 1913 to 1919, then moved back to the University of Bologna, where he retired in 1936.

He was an Invited Speaker of the ICM in 1924 in Toronto and in 1928 in Bologna.

Bortolotti must also be considered a differential geometer and a relativist, too. In fact, in the year 1929, he commented on the geometric basis for Einstein’s absolute parallelism theory in a paper entitled "Stars of congruences and absolute parallelism: Geometric basis for a recent theory of Einstein".

His son Enea was a mathematician too. Bortolotti died in Bologna.

== Selected works ==
- On metric connections with absolute parallelism, Proc. Kon. Akad. Wet. Amsterdam 30 (1927), 216-218.
- Reti di Cebiceff e sistemi coniugati nelle V_{n} riemanniane, Rend. Reale Acc. dei Lincei (6a) 5 (1927), 741-747.
- Stelle di congruenze e parallelismo assoluto: basi geometriche di una recente teoria di Einstein, Rend. Reale Acc. dei Lincei 9 (1929), 530-538.
- I primi algoritmi infiniti nelle opere dei matematici italiani del secolo XVII (1939)
- L'Opera geometrica di Evangelista Torricelli (1939)
- Le fonti della matematica moderna. Matematica sumerica e matematica babilonese (1940)
- Influenza del campo numerico sullo sviluppo delle teorie algebriche (1941)
- Il carteggio matematico di Giovanni Regiomontano con Giovanni Bianchini, Giacomo Speier e Cristiano Roder (1942)
- La pubblicazione delle opere e del carteggio matematico di Paolo Ruffini (1943)
- Il problema della tangente nell'opera geometrica di Evangelista Torricelli (1943)
- Le serie divergenti nel carteggio matematico di Paolo Ruffini (1944)
- Il carteggio matematico di Paolo Ruffini (1947)
