= Antonio Collalto (mathematician) =

Italian mathematician and physicist (1765–1820)

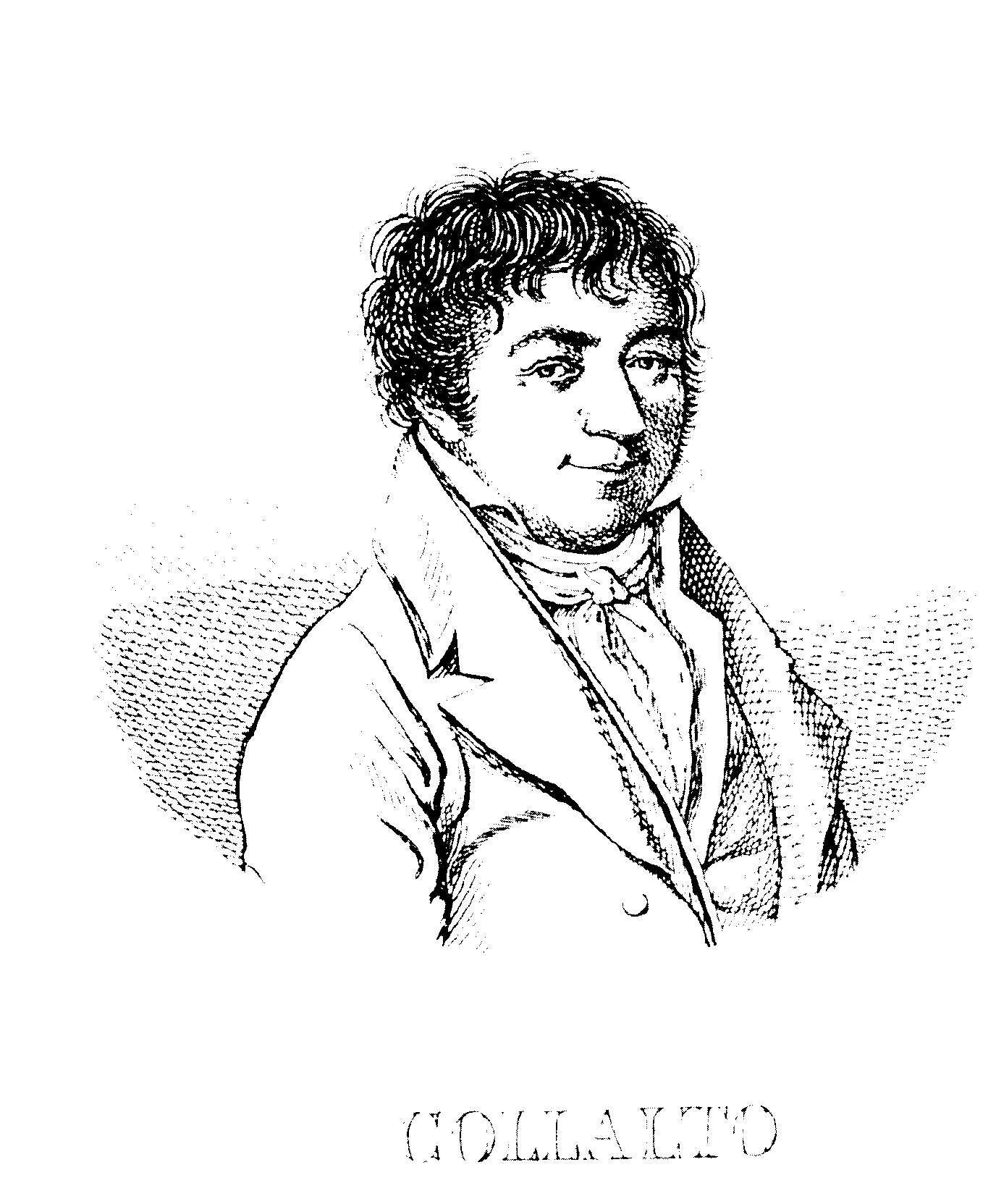
Antonio Collalto

Antonio Collalto (21 or 22 April 1765, Venice – 16 July 1820, Padua) was an Italian mathematician and physicist.

== Life ==
He was from a modest and otherwise unrecorded family. According to Emmanuele Antonio Cicogna, his surname did not indicate a connection with the house of Collalto but instead his status as a Jewish convert to Catholicism in his youth. He was unable to study at the Patriarchal Seminary of Venice, run by the Somaschi Fathers, and gained a scientific education from the physicist Vincenzo Miotti. He completed his studies and then became a priest. In 1795 he became professor of maths and physics in the public schools of Venice. In 1806 he became professor of 'introduzione al calcolo sublime' (introductory sublime calculus) and geodesy at the University of Padua, but was sacked when the Austrian Empire took back control in 1814 for his reputation as a Jacobin. From 1815 onwards he was a member of the Accademia nazionale delle scienze.

== Selected works ==
- Metodo analitico per conoscere la fallacia di alcune dimostrazioni (Analytical method to know the fallacy of some demonstrations), 1792.
- Discorso sul metodo di studiare le matematiche (Discourse on how to study mathematics), 1793.
- Identità del calcolo differenziale con quello delle serie ovvero il metodo degli infinitamente piccoli di leibnizio spiegato e dimostrato colla teria delle funzioni di Lagrange (Identification of differential calculus with series calculus or the infinitely small Leibnitz method explained and demonstrated with the theories of Lagrange functions), 1802. (digitized version edited by the BEIC)
- Dell'istruzione teorico-pratica degli ingegneri (On the theoretical and practical training of engineers), 1804.
- Geometria analitica a due coordinate (Analytic geometry to two coordinates), 1806.
- Nuove lezioni di geometria analitica a tre coordinate (New analytical geometry lessons to three coordinates), 1809.
- Nuovo saggio di poliendrometria analitica (A new essay on analytical polyendrometry), 1810.
