= Enrico D'Ovidio =

Italian mathematician (1843–1933)

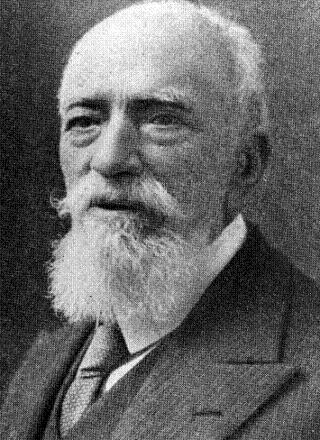
- Born: 11 August 1843; Campobasso, Kingdom of the Two Sicilies
- Died: 21 March 1933 (aged 90); Turin, Kingdom of Italy
- Education: University of Naples
- Known for: Geometry
- Spouse: Maria Bonacossa
- Scientific career
- Fields: Mathematics
- Workplaces: University of Turin
- Notable students: Giuseppe Peano; Corrado Segre

Enrico D'Ovidio (1843–1933) was an Italian mathematician who is known by his works on geometry.

== Life and work ==
D'Ovidio, son of liberal parents involved in the Italian independence movement, studied at the University of Naples under his uncle, Achille Sannia, who prepared him to enter the School of Bridges and Roads. In 1869, he published with Sannia a very successful textbook to teach geometry in the schools.

Encouraged by Eugenio Beltrami, he obtained the chair on Algebra and Analytic Geometry at the University of Turin in 1872, and he remained there for the remaining 46 years of his life. He was also rector of the university from 1880 to 1885.

The research of D'Ovidio was mainly in geometry, and the most important works were produced when he was in Turin. Specially interesting is his work Le funzioni metriche fondamentali negli spazi di quante si vogliono dimensioni e di curvatura costante (The fundamental metrical functions in the n-dimensional spaces of constant curvature), published in 1876 and where he stated for first time the law of sines in n-dimensional curved spaces.

== Sources ==
- Chang, Sooyoung (2011). Academic Genealogy of Mathematicians. World Scientific. ISBN 978-981-4282-29-1.
- De Lisio, Carlo (2008). Compendio storico di scienziati del Molise (in Italian). Campobasso MG Communication.
- Eriksson, Folke (1978). "The law of sines for tetrahedra and n-simplices". Geometriae Dedicata. 4 (1): 71–80. doi:10.1007/BF00181352. ISSN 0046-5755. S2CID 120391200.
- Kennedy, Hubert C. (1980). Peano: Life and Works of Giuseppe Peano. Reidel Publishing Co. ISBN 978-90-277-1068-0.
