= Ramiro Rampinelli =

Italian mathematician and physicist (1697–1759)

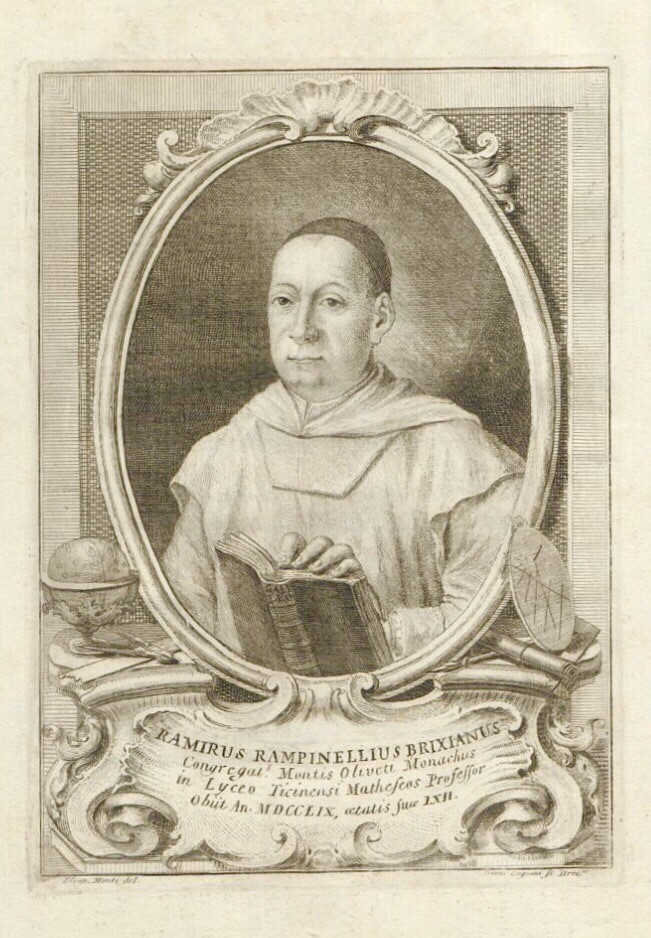
- Ramiro Rampinelli
- Born: Lodovico Rampinelli; 9 August 1697; Brescia, Republic of Venice (now Italy)
- Died: 8 February 1759 (aged 61); Milan, Duchy of Milan (now Italy)
- Education: University of Bologna
- Parent(s): Marchesio and Angelica Rampinelli
- Scientific career
- Fields: Mathematics; Physics
- Workplaces: University of Pavia
- Academic advisors: Gabriele Manfredi
- Notable students: Maria Gaetana Agnesi; Paolo Frisi

Ramiro Rampinelli (10 August 1697 – 8 February 1759), born Lodovico Rampinelli, was an Italian mathematician and physicist. He was a monk in the Olivetan Order. He had a decisive influence on the spread of mathematical analysis, algebra and mathematical physics in the best universities of Italy. He is one of the best-known Italian scholars in the field of infinitesimal mathematics of the first half of the 18th century.

== Biography ==
He was born in Brescia into the noble Rampinelli family and educated by the Jesuits; he learned the rudiments of mathematics from Giovan Battista Mazini.

He studied first at the University of Bologna, where he was a disciple of Gabriele Manfredi, and took his monastic vows on 1 November 1722 at San Michele in Bosco.

In 1727, after a brief stay at the Monastery of St. Helen in Venice, he entered the Abbey of St. Benedict in Padua, where he made the acquaintance of the best-known professors of mathematics at the University of Padua, such as Marquess Giovanni Poleni and Count Jacopo Riccati; he formed a lasting friendship with the latter's family.

In 1731 he was in Rome for a year, spending time with Celestino Galiani and Antonio Leprotti, studying subjects including architecture.

After a period at the University of Naples Federico II, during which time he was always in contact with the best mathematicians, such as Nicola Antonio De Martino, he was assigned by his superiors to the University of Pavia for a year. He then returned to the University of Bologna in 1733 to teach mathematics. Here he completed his Istituzioni Fisiche con il metodo analitico.

In 1740, after a stay at the monastery of St. Francis in Brescia, he transferred to the Olivetan monastery of San Vittore al Corso in Milan, where he was also mathematics tutor to the noblewoman Maria Gaetana Agnesi, who remembered him with gratitude in the preface to her Instituzioni Analitiche per la gioventù d'Italia.

In 1747, the Senate of Milan appointed him (at double salary) to the chair in Mathematics and Physics at the University of Pavia. His expertise in river hydraulics also earned him the appointment as supervisor both for the construction of the Pavia-Milan canal and for the construction of the embankment to contain the Po River at Parpanese, in the Oltrepò Pavese.

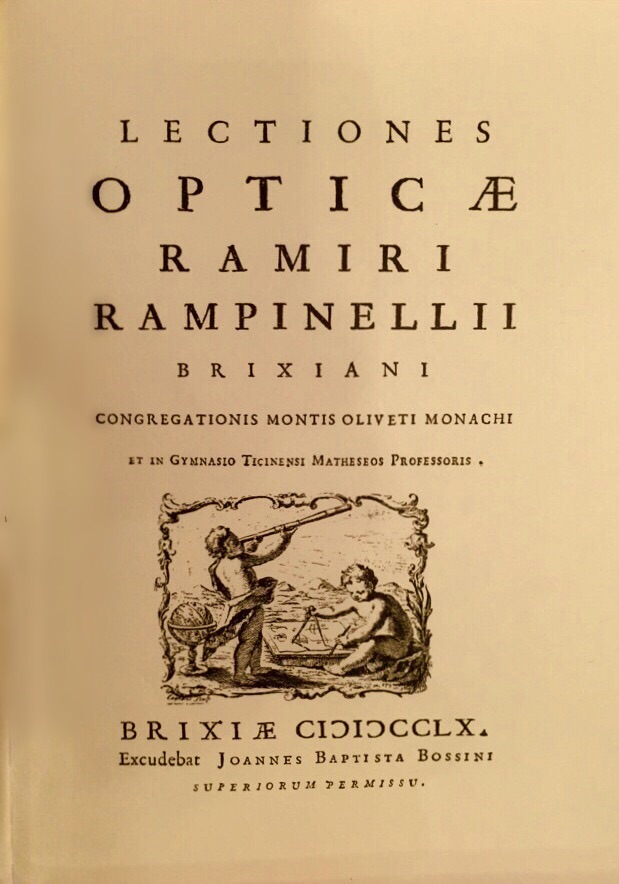
Frontispiece of Rampinelli's Lectiones opticæ

In 1758, his Lectiones opticæ Ramiri Rampinelii brixiani Congregationis Montis Oliveti monachi et in gymnasio Ticinensi Matheseos Professoris was published with the prestigious Brescia printer Bossini. This work on optics was to have been followed by Trigonometria and Applicazione dei principi matematici alla fisica pratica, but Rampinelli suffered a stroke on 10 April 1758.

After a short period of recuperation in Brescia, he returned to the monastery of San Vittore al Corso in Milan, where, on 8 February 1759, he had a second stroke and died.

Giordano Riccati wrote in a supplement to his eulogy dated 9 January 1760:

In him were united doctrine and an indescribable modesty, and firm religious faith accompanied by all the moral and Christian virtues. His only thoughts were ever to fulfill the obligations of his own condition, and study his only innocent passion, by which he let himself be dominated, virtuously directing it outward in indefatigable service of his Religion and the Public. He dedicated himself willingly to others' benefit, and of benefits received, an indelible, grateful memory was preserved.

== Works ==
- Lectiones opticæ Ramiri Rampinelii brixiani Congregationis Montis Oliveti monachi et in gymnasio Ticinensi Matheseos Professoris. Brixiæ: excudebat Joannes Baptista Bossini. 1760.

Other works by Rampinelli, said by contemporaries to be preserved in manuscript at the monastery of San Vittore in Milan, are now lost.

- Applicazione de' principi alla fisica pratica
- Trattato di trigonometria piana e sferica
- Istituzioni Fisiche con il metodo analitico
- Trattato di idrostatica (ad integrazione delle istituzioni fisiche)

== Sources and further reading ==
- O'Connor, John J.; Robertson, Edmund F., "Ramiro Lodovico Rampinelli", MacTutor History of Mathematics Archive, University of St Andrews
- "Elogium Patris D. Ramiro Rampinelli Brixiani". Excerpta Totius Italiae necnon Helvetiae literaturae. III. Bern: 103–107. 1759.
- Pozzi, Giacomo Ippolito (1760). "Elogio del P.D. Ramiro Rampinelli Bresciano". Giornale de' Letterati. Rome: 87–97.
- Torriceni, Francesco (1760). "De Vita Rampinelli Epistola". Lectiones Opticae. Brescia: Giovanni Battista Bossini. pp. XIII–XXXI.
- Fabroni, Angelo (1781). Vitae Italorum doctrina excellentium. Vol. VIII. Pisa: Giuseppe Giovannelli. pp. 143–178.
- Brognoli, Antonio (1785). Elogi de' Bresciani per dottrina eccellenti nel secolo XVIII. Brescia: Vescovi. pp. 63–88.
- Verri, Pietro (1787). Memorie appartenenti alla vita ed agli studi di P. Frisi. Milan: Giuseppe Marelli.
- Frisi, Antonio Francesco (1799). Elogio storico di Donna Maria Gaetana Agnesi Milanese. Milan: Galeazzi.
- Peroni, Vincenzo (1821). Biblioteca Bresciana. Vol. III. Brescia: Bettoni & Soci. pp. 92–94.
- Gambara, Giovanni Francesco (1840). Ragionamenti di cose patrie. Vol. IV. Brescia: Venturini. pp. 162–165.
- Poggendorf, Johann Christian (1863). Biographisch-literarisches Handwörterbuch zur Geschichte der exakten Wissenschaften. Vol. II. Leipzig: J.A. Barth. p. 566.
- Cocchetti, Carlo (1880). Del movimento intellettuale nella provincia di Brescia. Brescia: Libreria antica e moderna. p. 64.
- Baldini, Ugo (1980). "L'insegnamento fisico matematico a Pavia alle soglie dell'età Teresiana". Economia, istituzioni, cultura in Lombardia nell'età di Maria Teresa. Vol. III. Milan: Il Mulino. pp. 863–886.
- Roero, Clara Silvia (2015). "M.G. Agnesi, R. Rampinelli and the Riccati Family: A Cultural Fellowship". Historia Mathematica. 42: 296–314. doi:10.1016/j.hm.2014.12.001. hdl:2318/1514382.
