= Jacopo Riccati =

Italian mathematician (1676–1754)

- Engraved portrait of Jacopo Francesco Riccati by Innocente Alessandri
- Born: 28 May 1676; Venice, Venetian Republic
- Died: 15 April 1754 (aged 77); Treviso, Venetian Republic
- Education: University of Padua (LL.D., 1696)
- Known for: Riccati equation
- Scientific career
- Fields: Mathematician
- Notable students: Vincenzo Riccati

Notes
- Father of Vincenzo Riccati and Giordano Riccati.

Jacopo Francesco Riccati (28 May 1676 – 15 April 1754) was a Venetian mathematician and jurist from Venice, known for his widely influential work on solving differential equations. He is best known for having studied the equation that bears his name.

== Biography ==
=== Early life and education ===
Jacopo Riccati was born on 28 May 1676 to a noble family. His mother belonged to the Colonna family, one of the most influential princely families in Renaissance Rome. His father, a nobleman, died when he was still a boy, leaving him an estate sufficient for lifelong independence.

He was educated first at the Jesuit school for the nobility in Brescia, and in 1693 he entered the University of Padua to study law. He received a doctorate in law (LL.D.) in 1696. Encouraged by Stefano degli Angeli to pursue mathematics, he studied mathematical analysis. By 1710 he was familiar with the ideas of differential and integral calculus. His main work was in the field of differential equations, and he introduced new methods to solve them, such as the methods of separating variables and lowering the order of the equation. He corresponded with several European mathematicians, including Leonhard Euler and Daniel and Nicholas Bernoulli. Riccati personally supervised the education of Ramiro Rampinelli, the teacher of Maria Gaetana Agnesi and Paolo Frisi.

=== Career ===
Riccati received various academic offers but declined them in order to devote his full attention to the study of mathematical analysis on his own. In 1696 he married the countess Elisabetta Onigo, and established his residence in Treviso, refusing the invitation by Peter the Great to become the president of the St. Petersburg Academy of Sciences. He was also asked to Vienna as an imperial councillor (Consigliere Aulico) and offered a professorship as the University of Padua. He declined all these offers, preferring to stay in Italy and devote himself to his studies privately.

Riccati played a pivotal role in the diffusion of Newton's ideas in Italy. Most of his scientific work concerns mathematical analysis, especially differential equations. He is best known for introducing the differential equation that bears his name:
$$y'(x) = q_0(x) + q_1(x) \, y(x) + q_2(x) \, y^2(x)$$
where $q_0(x) \neq 0$ and $q_2(x) \neq 0$.

This non-linear ordinary differential equation was to become of paramount importance in the centuries to come. Some of his work on polynomials was included by Maria Gaetana Agnesi, at Riccati's request, in the book on integral calculus of her Analytical Institutions. Riccati was very interested in hydraulics as well, and was often consulted by the Senate of Venice on the construction of canals and dikes along rivers. In addition, he studied economics, history, theology, ethics, metaphysics, and poetry. His works were collected and published in four volumes after his death (Lucca 1761-1765).

== Personal life ==
Riccati and his wife had nine children, three of whom followed in their father's footsteps. Vincenzo Riccati, a Jesuit, pioneered the development of hyperbolic functions. Giordano Riccati was the first to measure the ratio of Young's moduli of metals—preceding the better known Thomas Young by 25 years.

== Honors ==
Jacopo Riccati was named honorary Academician of the Academy of Sciences of the Institute of Bologna in 1723. The 6,5-kilometer sized main-belt asteroid 14074 Riccati, discovered at the San Vittore Observatory in 1996, was named in honor of him and his two sons, Vincenzo and Giordano.

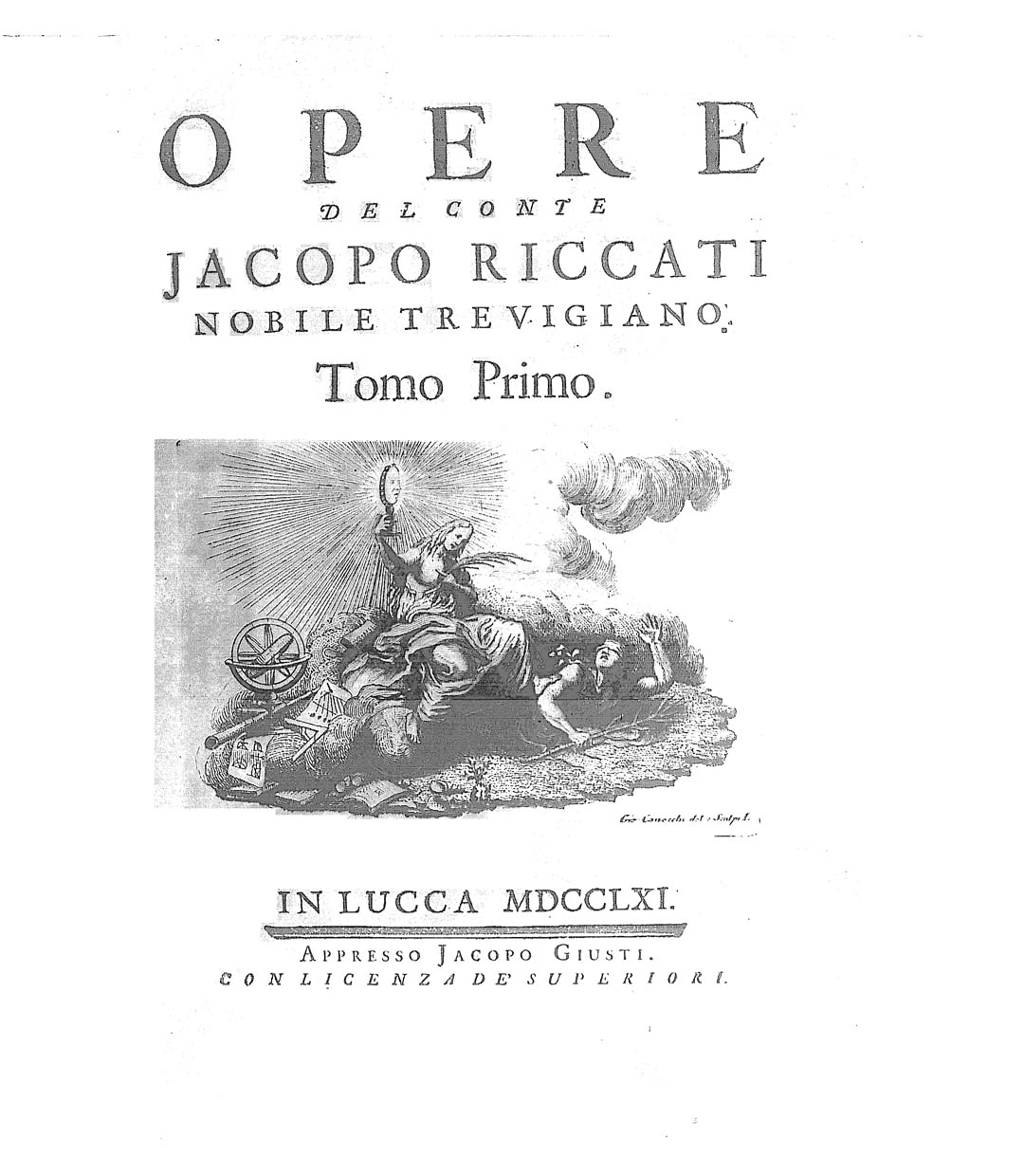
Opere, 1761

== Works ==
- Opere (in Italian). Vol. 1. Lucca: Iacopo Giusti. 1761.
- Opere (in Italian). Vol. 2. Lucca: Iacopo Giusti. 1762.
- Opere (in Italian). Vol. 3. Lucca: Iacopo Giusti. 1764.
- Opere (in Italian). Vol. 4. Lucca: Giuseppe Rocchi. 1765.
- M. L. Soppelsa, ed. (1985). Jacopo Riccati – Antonio Vallisneri, Carteggio (1719-1729). Florence: Leo S. Olschki. ISBN 978-8822233097.

== Bibliography ==
- O'Connor, John J.; Robertson, Edmund F., "Jacopo Riccati", MacTutor History of Mathematics Archive, University of St Andrews
- Natucci, A. (1970). "Riccati, Jacopo Francesco". In Charles Coulston Gillispie (ed.). Dictionary of Scientific Biography. Vol. 11. New York: Charles Scribner's Sons. pp. 399–401.
- Bittanti, S. (1991). "Count Riccati and the Early Days of the Riccati Equation". In S. Bittanti; A.J. Laub; J.C. Willems (eds.). The Riccati Equation. Communications and Control Engineering Series. Berlin, Heidelberg: Springer. pp. 1–10. doi:10.1007/978-3-642-58223-3_1.
- Soppelsa, Maria Laura (1992). "Jacopo Riccati e l'Illuminismo filosofico e scientifico veneto". In G. Piaia; M.L. Soppelsa (eds.). I Riccati e la cultura della Marca nel Settecento europeo. Florence: Leo S. Olschki. pp. 27–73. ISBN 978-8822239686.
- Roero, Clara Silvia (2015). "M.G. Agnesi, R. Rampinelli and the Riccati family: A cultural fellowship formed for an important scientific purpose, the Instituzioni analitiche". Historia Mathematica. 42 (3): 296–314. doi:10.1016/j.hm.2014.12.001. hdl:2318/1514382.
- Mazzone, Silvia; Roero, Clara Silvia (2002). "Le equazioni differenziali nel Settecento". Storia della Scienza. Vol. VI: L’Età dei Lumi. Rome: Istituto dell'Enciclopedia Italiana. pp. 418–430.
- Lugaresi, Maria Giulia; Milici, Pietro (2022). "Lettere inedite nella corrispondenza tra Jacopo Riccati e Giovanni Poleni". In G.P. Brizzi; M. Donattini (eds.). Conoscere il passato per progettare il futuro: studi per l’Ottavo Centenario dell’Università di Padova. Bologna: Il Mulino. pp. 113–148.
