= Francesco Maria Preti =

Italian architect

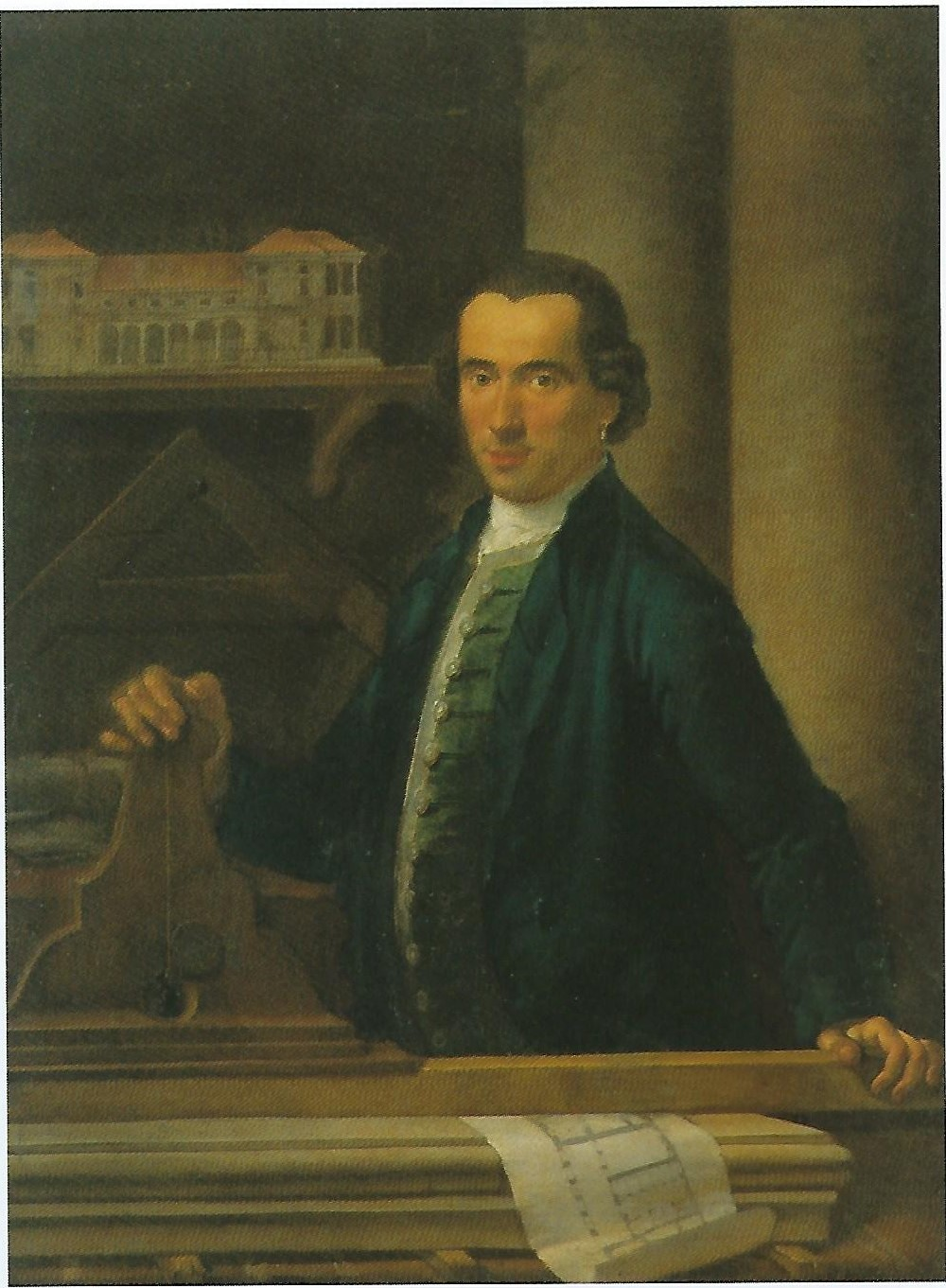
- Portrait of Francesco Maria Preti attributed to Alessandro Longhi
- Born: 19 May 1701; Castelfranco Veneto, Republic of Venice
- Died: 23 December 1774 (aged 73); Castelfranco Veneto, Republic of Venice
- Known for: Architecture
- Notable work: Villa Pisani, Stra; Villa Spineda Loredan
- Movement: late-Baroque and Neoclassicism

Francesco Maria Preti (19 May 1701 – 23 december 1774) was an Italian architect of the late-Baroque period.

== Biography ==
=== Early life and education ===
Preti was born in Castelfranco Veneto on 19 May 1701. He spent two years studying at the Jesuit Collegio Arici in Brescia. On his return to Castelfranco he found an effective guide for his development as an architect in the physicist and engineer Giovanni Rizzetti (1675–1751) and in the mathematicians and amateur architects who frequented the circle of Jacopo Riccati and his sons Vincenzo, Giordano and Francesco.

=== Castelfranco Cathedral ===
In 1723, when Rizzetti proposed that he draw up a plan for the Castelfranco Cathedral, Preti dedicated himself enthusiastically to the study of Andrea Palladio’s buildings, which were to be found throughout the countryside around his native town, including the Villa Cornaro at Piombino Dese, the Villa Barbaro at Maser and the Villa Emo at Fanzolo; he also studied the theoretical aspects of Palladio’s Quattro libri dell’architettura (1570).

The cathedral was begun in 1723 but not consecrated until 1777. In 1780 the façade was erected on what was to have been the site of Preti’s vestibule. Preti paid close attention to the relationships between music and architecture and employed the principle of proportional harmonic average to determine the proportions of the cathedral. In doing so he followed the practical method of application formulated by Jacopo Riccati, who was the first to develop the principle in Italy. In France these theories were being addressed by Charles Étienne Briseux and Jacques-François Blondel.

=== Mature works ===
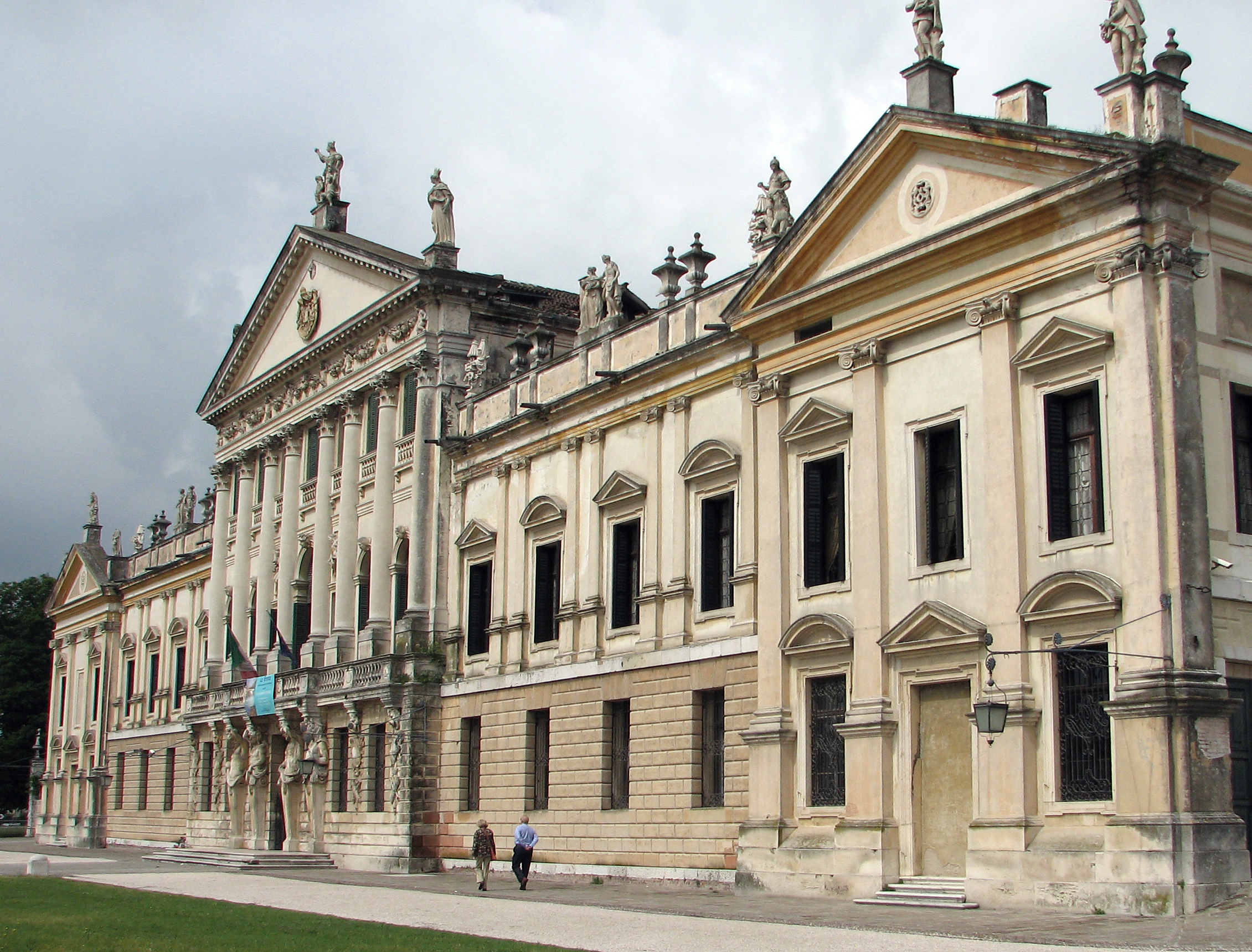
Villa Pisani, Stra

Between 1735 and 1756 Preti worked on the construction of the grandiose Villa Pisani at Stra, where he took over the original project of Girolamo Frigimelica Roberti, dating from before 1722. Of the original design, only a small part of the central block of the villa was actually built; Preti was therefore responsible for almost the entire building, including the grand central ballroom decorated in 1761–2 with Giovanni Battista Tiepolo’s frescoes of the Apotheosis of the Pisani Family.

During approximately the same period Preti built modest parish churches in a Palladian style at Vallà (c. 1735), Tombolo (1750), Salvatronda (1751–76) and Caselle (1757). Of greater interest, however, are his unexecuted designs for projects such as the façade of Santa Giustina (Treviso, Biblioteca Capitolare); for the organization of buildings on the Prato della Valle, Padua; and for the royal palace and cathedral in Lisbon (Treviso, Biblioteca Capitolare).

In 1754 Preti was commissioned by the Riccati family to design a new classical theatre at Castelfranco. This was in response to the need for a larger meeting place for the regular visitors to their cultural circle, which had until then gathered at their ancestral home at Ponte delle Guglie. Work was completed in 1780, except for the vestibule and façade, which were not finished until the mid-19th century. In this building Preti again determined the proportions by using the principle of proportional harmonic average.

He also designed the Accademia degli Anistamici at Belluno (1774), the Villa Spineda Loredan at Volpago del Montello (1753–9), the latter in collaboration with Giovanni Miazzi (1699–1797), and the Villa Frova at Cavasagra near Treviso, all in a strict Palladian style.

=== Theoretical works ===
Preti’s theoretical work on the correspondence of musical ratios to architecture is contained in his Elementi di architettura, published posthumously in Venice in 1780 with a preface by Giordano Riccati. The work had a wide distribution and exerted great influence on the development of Neoclassical architecture.

== Gallery ==
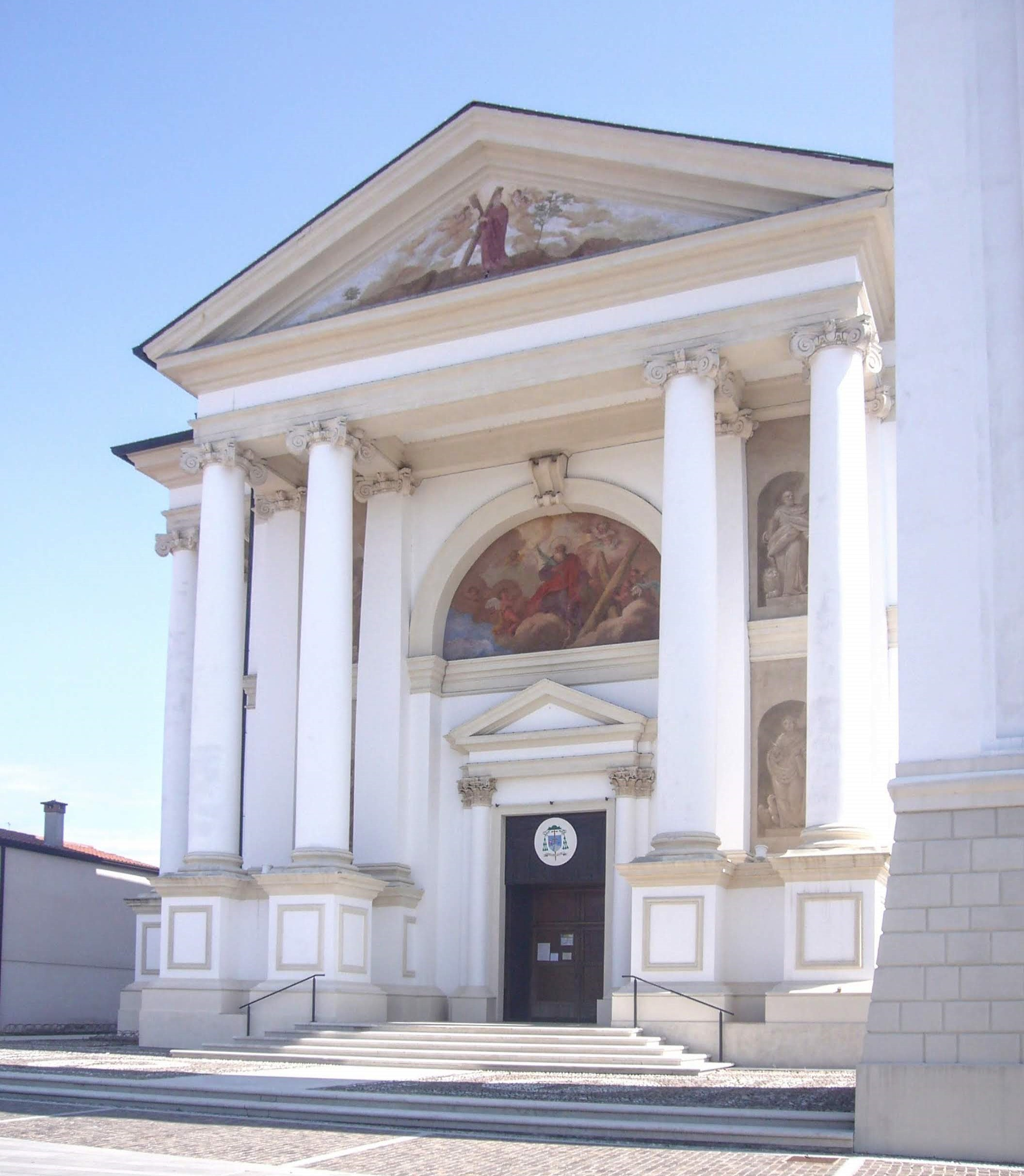
Sant'Andrea Apostolo, Tombolo

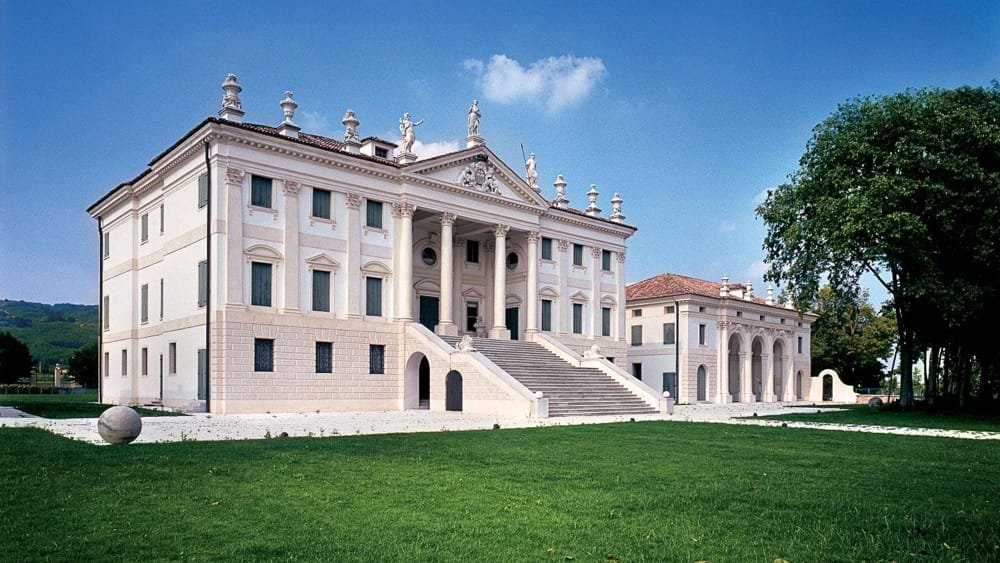
Villa Loredan, Paese

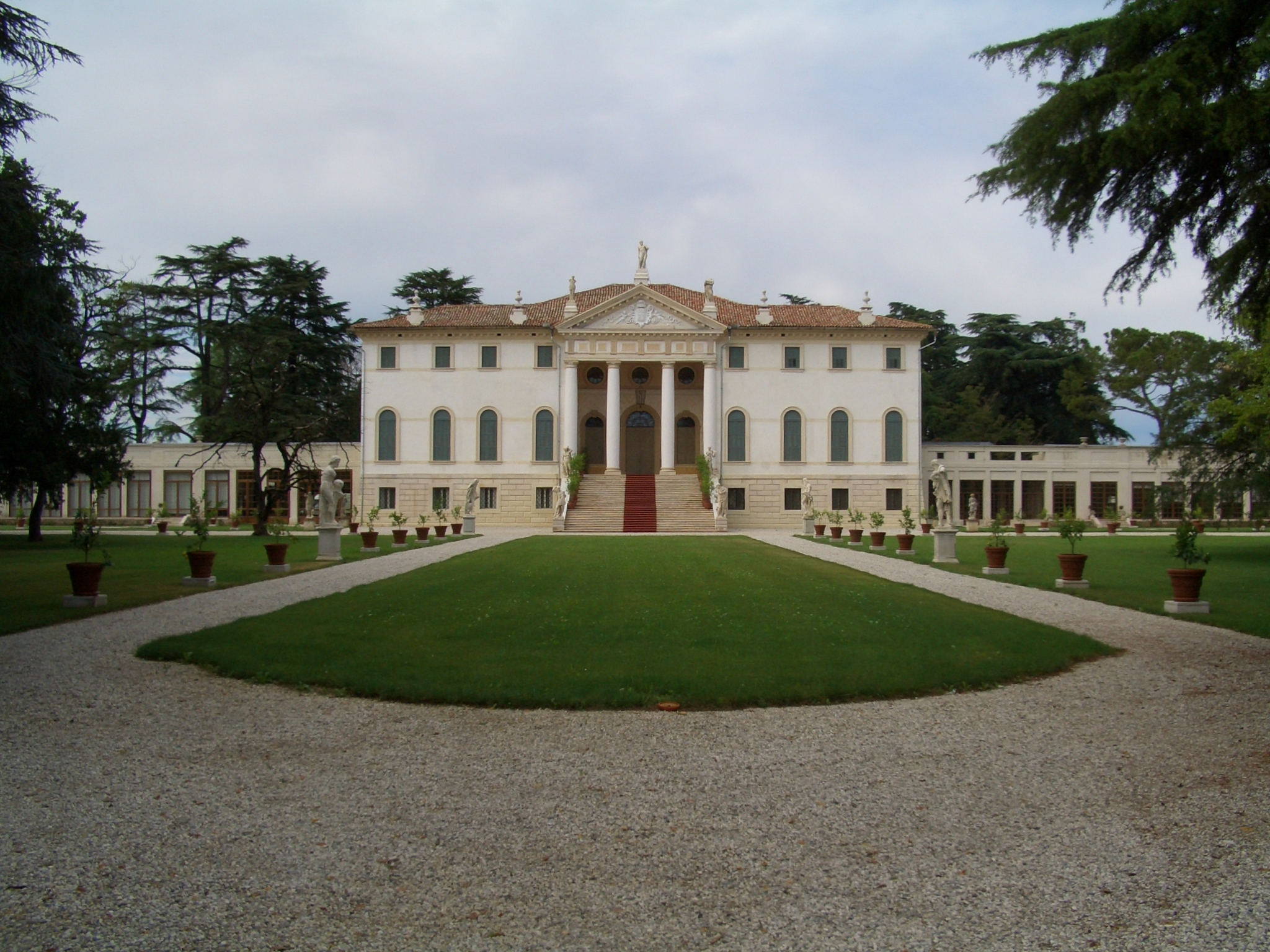
Villa Corner della Regina, Cavasagra di Vedelago
