= Mazzini (surname) =

Mazzini is an Italian surname. Notable people with the surname include:

- Gianluca Mazzini, Italian engineer
- Giovanni Battista Mazzini, Italian physician and mathematician
- Giuseppe Mazzini, Italy's independence/unification activist
- Louis Yolando Mazzini, Peruvian serologist
- Miha Mazzini, Slovenian writer, scriptwriter and film director
- Mina Mazzini, Italian pop singer
- Marco Antonio Mazzini, Peruvian clarinetist
