= Cupillari =

Cupillari may refer to:

- Antonella Cupillari (born 1955), Italian-American mathematician
- Cupillari Observatory, astronomical observatory operated by Keystone College in Pennsylvania
