= Giordano Riccati =

Italian physicist (1709–1790)

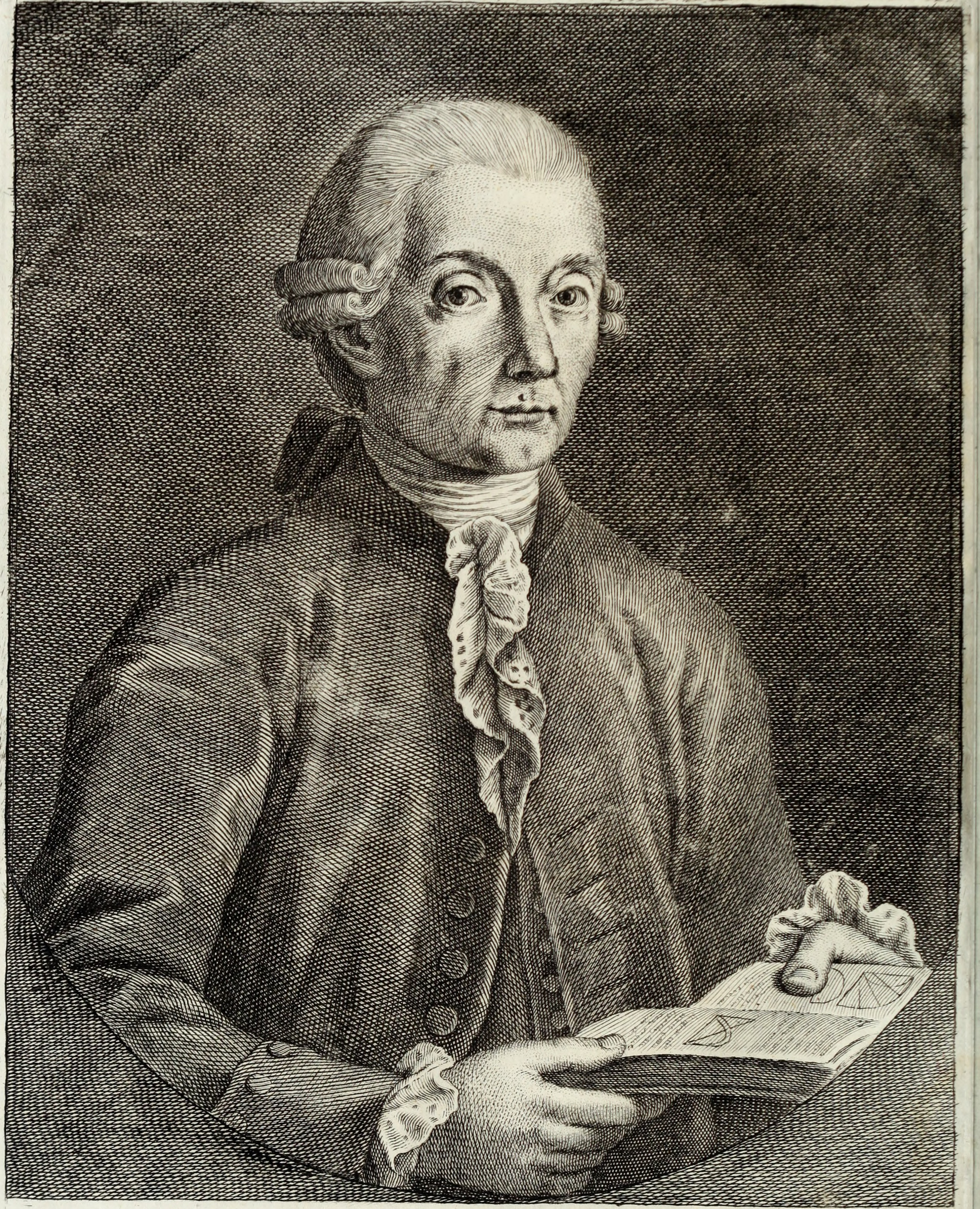
- Giordano Riccati
- Born: 25 February 1709; Castelfranco Veneto, Venetian Republic
- Died: 20 July 1790 (aged 81); Treviso, Venetian Republic
- Burial place: Treviso Cathedral
- Education: University of Padua
- Known for: Young's moduli
- Scientific career
- Fields: Mathematician and physicist
- Academic advisors: Giovanni Poleni; Antonio Vallisneri

Notes
- He is the son of Jacopo Riccati and the brother of Vincenzo Riccati.

Giordano Riccati or Jordan Riccati (25 February, 1709 – 20 July, 1790) was an Italian mathematician and physicist. The son of the mathematician Jacopo Riccati, he was the first experimental physicist to study material elastic moduli.

== Biography ==
Giordano Riccati was born in 1709 in Castelfranco Veneto, a small town about 30 km north of Padua. He was the brother of Vincenzo Riccati and the fifth son of the theoretical mechanician Jacopo Riccati.

He began his studies at the College of St. Francis Xavier in Bologna, under the guidance of Francesco Saverio Quadrio and Luigi Marchenti, a pupil of the French mathematician Pierre Varignon. In 1727, he returned to Castelfranco, where his father taught him geometry, trigonometry, calculus, statics and dynamics. He then moved to the University of Padua and attended Giovanni Poleni's lessons on hydraulics as well as the lectures of the famous physician and naturalist Antonio Vallisneri.

A polymath with a vast range of interests, Riccati published treatises on mathematics, architecture, acoustics, music theory, history and metaphysics. He made significant contributions in the field of physics and mathematics applied to music, publishing the Saggio sulle leggi del contrappunto [Essay on the laws of counterpoint], which tried to prove that music is not just an art, but it is a science as well, a Trattato delle corde, ovvero delle Fibre Elastiche [Treaty on chords; on elastic fibers], and some studies on the works of Tartini and Rameau. Giordano helped with the improvements to the Cathedral of Treviso. He died in Treviso on July 20, 1790 and was buried in his family chapel in the Cathedral of Treviso.

Riccati was a member of the Accademia Galileiana of Padua, of the Academy of Sciences of the Institute of Bologna and of the Italian National Academy of Sciences. Riccati corresponded regularly with the finest scholars of the period and cultivated a circle of friends with similar interests – intellectuals, artists, and writers who often gathered at his house. He enjoyed a close friendship with the architect Francesco Maria Preti, whose treatise Elementi di architettura he edited after Preti's death.

== Contributions ==
Riccati was the first experimental mechanician to study material elastic moduli as we understand them today. His 1782 paper on determining the relative Young's moduli of steel and brass using flexural vibrations preceded Thomas Young's 1807 paper on the subject of moduli. The ratio that Riccati found was:

$$\frac{E_{\mbox{steel}}}{E_{\mbox{brass}}} = 2.06$$

Even though the experiments were performed more than 200 years ago, this value is remarkably close to accepted values found in engineering handbooks in 2007.

== Works ==
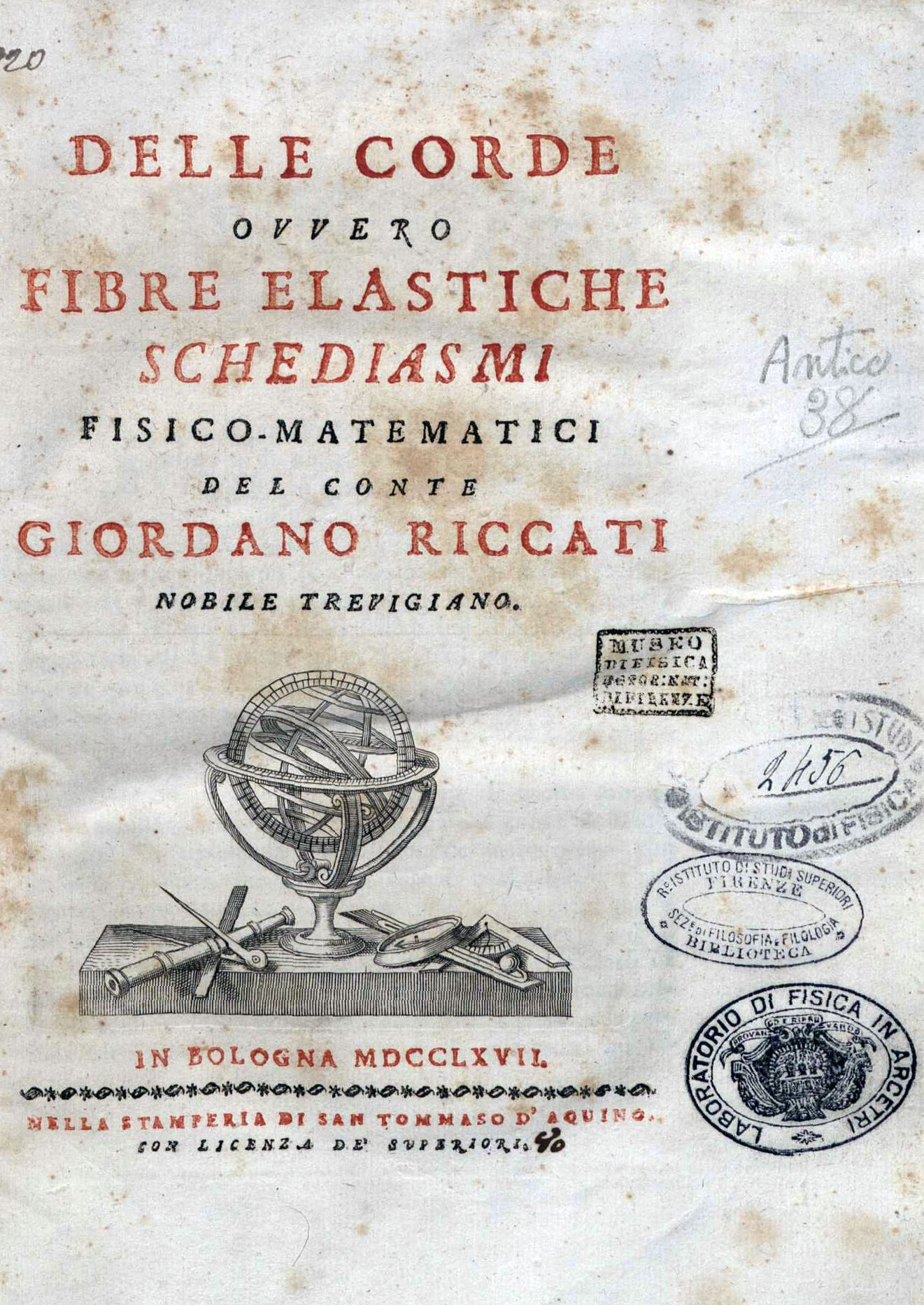
Delle corde, 1767

- Saggio sopra le leggi del contrappunto (in Italian). Castelfranco: Giulio Trento. 1762.
- Delle corde ovvero fibre elastiche (in Italian). Bologna: Stamperia di S. Tommaso d'Aquino. 1767.

== Bibliography ==
- O'Connor, John J.; Robertson, Edmund F., "Giordano Riccati", MacTutor History of Mathematics Archive, University of St Andrews
- Bagni, Giorgio T. (1997). "Il trevigiano Giordano Riccati (1709-1790) e la Matematica del Settecento" (PDF). Cassamarca. XI (2): 60–64.
- Davide Bonsi, ed. (2012). Giordano Riccati illuminista veneto ed europeo. Florence: Leo S. Olschki. ISBN 978-8822260994.
- Roero, Clara Silvia (2015). "M.G. Agnesi, R. Rampinelli and the Riccati family: A cultural fellowship formed for an important scientific purpose, the Instituzioni analitiche". Historia Mathematica. 42 (3): 296–314. doi:10.1016/j.hm.2014.12.001. hdl:2318/1514382.
- Roero, Clara Silvia (2016). "Riccati, Giordano". Dizionario Biografico degli Italiani (in Italian). Vol. 87: Renzi–Robortello. Rome: Istituto dell'Enciclopedia Italiana. ISBN 978-88-12-00032-6.
