= Vincenzo Riccati =

Italian mathematician and physicist (1707–1775)

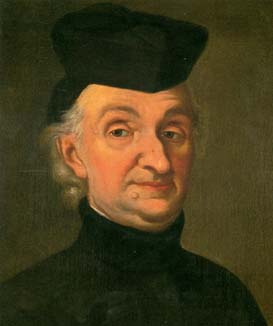
- Vincenzo Riccati (1707–1775)
- Born: 11 January 1707; Castelfranco Veneto, Venetian Republic
- Died: 17 January 1775 (aged 68); Treviso, Venetian Republic
- Burial place: Treviso Cathedral
- Known for: Hyperbolic functions
- Scientific career
- Fields: Mathematician and physicist
- Workplaces: College of San Francesco Saverio, Bologna; Pontifical Gregorian University
- Academic advisors: Jacopo Riccati
- Notable students: Gian Francesco Malfatti; Girolamo Saladini

Notes
- He is the son of Jacopo Riccati and the brother of Giordano Riccati.

Vincenzo Riccati (Castelfranco Veneto, 11 January 1707 – Treviso, 17 January 1775) was a Venetian Catholic priest, mathematician, and physicist. He is credited with introducing hyperbolic functions.

== Life ==
Vincenzo Riccati was born in 1707 in Castelfranco Veneto, a small town about 30 km north of Padua. He was the brother of Giordano Riccati, and the second son of Jacopo Riccati. He began his studies at the College of St. Francis Xavier in Bologna, under the guidance of Luigi Marchenti, a pupil of the French mathematician Pierre Varignon. He entered the Society of Jesus on December 20, 1726. He taught belles lettres in the colleges of the Order in Piacenza (1728), Padua (1729), and Parma (1734). He then went to Rome to study theology. In 1739 he was assigned to the College of St. Francis Xavier of Bologna, where he taught mathematics for thirty years, succeeding his former teacher Luigi Marchenti. He was among the first members of the Italian National Academy of Sciences. In 1760 he was elected Honorary Fellow of the Russian Academy of Sciences.

Riccati's main research continued the work of his father in mathematical analysis, especially in the fields of the differential equations and physics. In 1746 and 1749 Riccati published two works, in which he discussed the question of the parallelogram of forces in the context of the vis viva controversy. In 1752, he published the short treatise De usu motus tractorii in constructione aequationum differentialium, in which he proved that all first-order (ordinary) differential equations conceivable at the time could be constructed using tractional motion.

Riccati's main contributions to mathematics and physics were published in two volumes, Opusculorum ad res physicas mathematicas pertinentium (Bologna, 1757-1762), where he introduced the use of hyperbolic functions. Vincenzo edited, in collaboration with his brother Giordano, the Works of his father and published, in collaboration with his friend and student Girolamo Saladini, the three-volume treatise Institutiones analyticae, an important textbook on calculus printed in Bologna in 1765-67. Ten years later Saladini produced an Italian translation of the work under the title Instituzioni Analitiche. Riccati's Institutiones analyticae is the fullest 18th-century Italian treatise on analytic methods in mathematics.

After the suppression of the Society of Jesus, Riccati retired to his family home in Treviso, where he died on January 17, 1775. Riccati was a friend and correspondent of Maria Gaetana Agnesi and Ramiro Rampinelli.

== Contributions ==
His contributions were in hyperbolic functions for solutions of cubics, their derivatives and exponential fiunctions. Lambert is sometimes incorrectly credited as the first to introduce the hyperbolic functions, however, he did this subsequent to Riccati's contributions in 1770. Riccati not only introduced these new functions but also derived the integral formulas connected with them. He then went on to derive the integral formulas for the trigonometric functions. Riccati with Saladini also worked on the rose curves, which was first postulated by Grandi. Like his father, Vincenzo Riccati was skilled in hydraulic engineering. His efforts and implementations of flood control projects saved the regions around Venice and Bologna.

== Riccati's hyperbolic addition laws ==
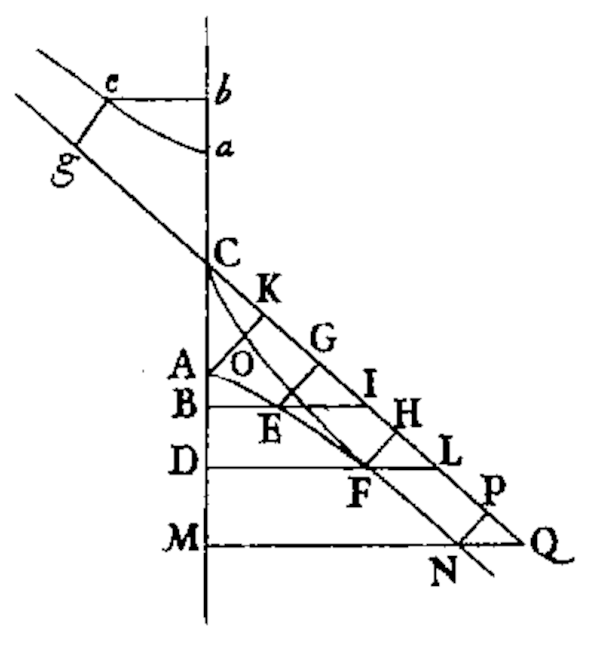
Riccati's (1757) illustration of hyperbolic addition laws.

Vincenzo Riccati (1757) introduced hyperbolic functions cosh and sinh, which he denoted as Ch. and Sh. related by $Ch.^{2}-Sh.^{2}=r^2$ with r being set to unity in modern publications, and formulated the addition laws of hyperbolic sine and cosine:

$$\begin{matrix}CA=r,\ CB=Ch.\varphi,\ BE=Sh.\varphi,\ CD=Ch.\pi,\ DF=Sh.\pi\\
CM=Ch.\overline{\varphi+\pi},\ MN=Sh.\overline{\varphi+\pi}\\
CK=\frac{r}{\sqrt{2}},\ CG=\frac{Ch.\varphi+Sh.\varphi}{\sqrt{2}},\ CH=\frac{Ch.\pi+Sh.\pi}{\sqrt{2}},\ CP=\frac{Ch.\overline{\varphi+\pi}+Sh.\overline{\varphi+\pi}}{\sqrt{2}}\\
CK:CG::CH:CP\\
\left[Ch.^{2}-Sh.^{2}=rr\right]\\
\hline Ch.\overline{\varphi+\pi}=\frac{Ch.\varphi\,Ch.\pi+Sh.\varphi\,Sh.\pi}{r}\\
Sh.\overline{\varphi+\pi}=\frac{Ch.\varphi\,Sh.\pi+Ch.\pi\,Sh.\varphi}{r}
\end{matrix}$$

He furthermore showed that $Ch.\overline{\varphi-\pi}$ and $Sh.\overline{\varphi-\pi}$ follow by setting $Ch.\pi\Rightarrow Ch.-\pi$ and $Sh.\pi\Rightarrow Sh.-\pi$ in the above formulas.

== Works ==
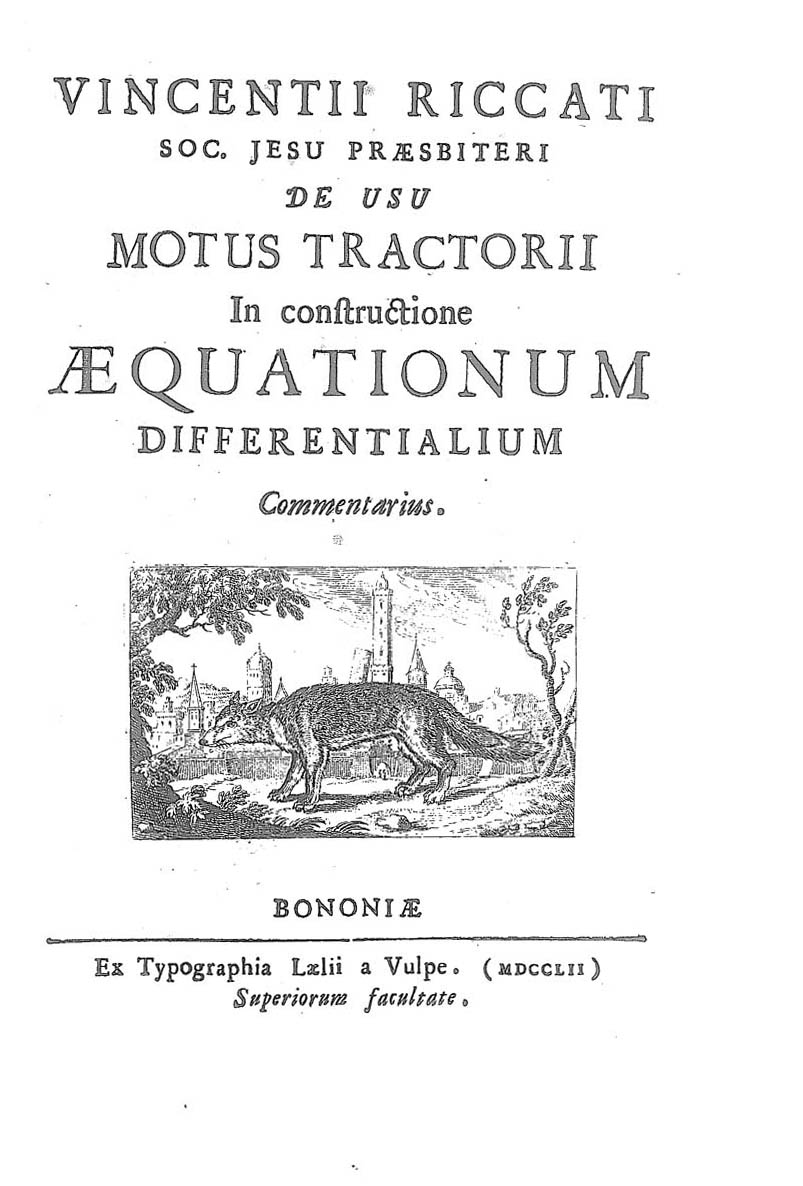
De usu motus tractorii in constructione aequationum differentialium (1752)

- Delle forze vive e dell'azioni delle forze morte. Bologna: Lelio dalla Volpe. 1749.
- De usu motus tractorii in constructione aequationum differentialium (in Latin). Bologna: ex typographia Laelii a Vulpe. 1752.
- Lettera di un cittadino romano al padre Tommaso Gabrini. S.l.: sn. 1753.
- Lettera di Vicenzio Riccati della Compagnia di Gesù alla Signora D. Gaetana Maria Agnesi intorno alla costruzione di alcune formule senza la separazione delle indeterminate. In: Gori, Antonio Francesco (ed.), Symbolae litterariae opuscula varia, vol. 10, Florence, 1753, pp. 62–72.
- De seriebus recipientibus summam generalem algebraicam aut exponentialem commentarius (in Latin). Bologna: Costantino Pisarri, Giacomo Filippo Primodi. 1756.
- Opusculorum ad res physicas et mathematicas pertinentium. 2 (in Latin). Bologna: Lelio Dalla Volpe. 1762.
- Vincenzo Riccati; Girolamo Saladini (1765). Institutiones analyticae (tre tomi) (in Latin). Bologna: Stamperia di S. Tommaso d'Aquino.
- De' principj della meccanica. Venice: Sebastiano Coleti. 1772.
- Dialogo, dove ne' congressi di più giornate delle forze vive e dell'azioni delle forze morte si tien discorso, Bologna, 1749

== See also ==
- Johann Heinrich Lambert
- Girolamo Saladini
- List of Roman Catholic scientist-clerics
- List of second-generation mathematicians

== Bibliography ==
- Michieli, Adriano Augusto (1943–44). "Una famiglia di matematici e poligrafi trevigiani: i Riccati. II. Vincenzo Riccati". Atti del R. Istituto Veneto di Scienze Lettere ed Arti. 103 (2): 69–109.
- Indorato, Luigi; Nastasi, Pietro (1991). "Riccati's proof of the parallelogram of forces in the context of the vis viva controversy". Physis. 28: 751–767.
- "Vincenzo Riccati". Science and Its Times: Understanding the Social Significance of Scientific Discovery. Vol. 4. Gale Group. 2000. p. 264. ISBN 9780787639365.
- Capecchi, Danilo (2012). History of Virtual Work Laws: A History of Mechanics Prospective. Springer. ISBN 9788847020566.
- Tournès, Dominique (2004). "Vincenzo Riccati's treatise on integration of differential equations by tractional motion (1752)". Oberwolfach Reports. 1: 2739–2741.
- Barnett, Janet Heine (2004). "Enter, Stage Center: The Early Drama of the Hyperbolic Functions". 77. 1: 15–30. JSTOR 3219227.
