= Villa Spineda Loredan =

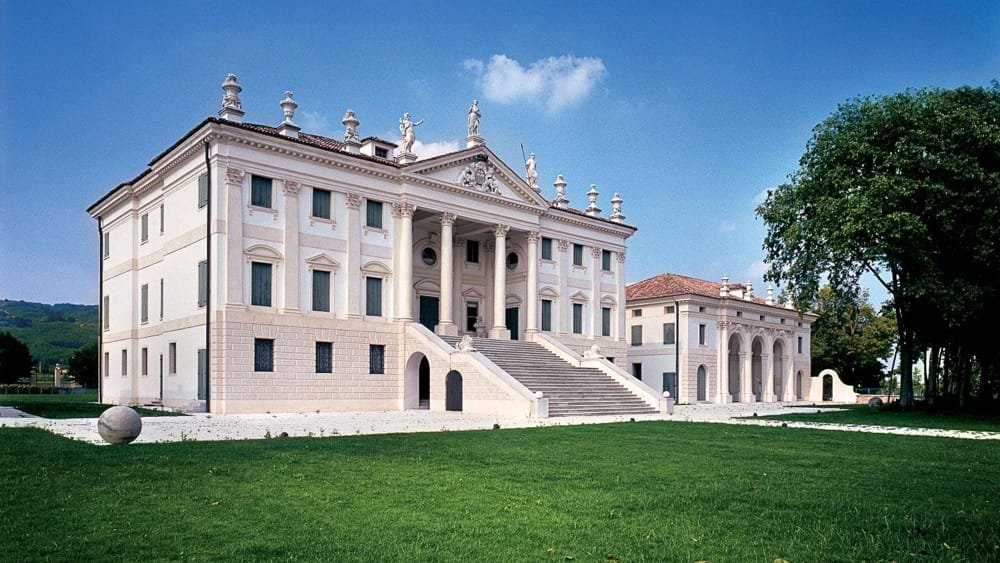
- Villa Spineda Loredan in Volpago del Montello
- Interactive map of the Villa Spineda Loredan area
- Alternative names: Villa Loredan at Paese
- Etymology: by the Spineda, Gasparini and Loredan families

General information
- Architectural style: Palladian, Neoclassicism
- Location: Via Jacopo Gasparini 73, Venegazzù, Volpago del Montello, Italy
- Construction started: 1753
- Owner: Intesa Sanpaolo
- Affiliation: House of Loredan

Technical details
- Floor count: 4
- Grounds: 200 acres (80 hectares)

Design and construction
- Architects: Giovanni Miazzi, Francesco Maria Preti

Renovating team
- Architect: Afra and Tobia Scarpa

Website
- https://www.loredangasparini.it

Villa Spineda Gasparini Loredan is an 18th-century Palladian style villa of the noble Loredan family located in the town of Volpago del Montello in the Veneto region of northeast Italy. It is regarded as one of the most beautiful villas of the Veneto.

== History ==
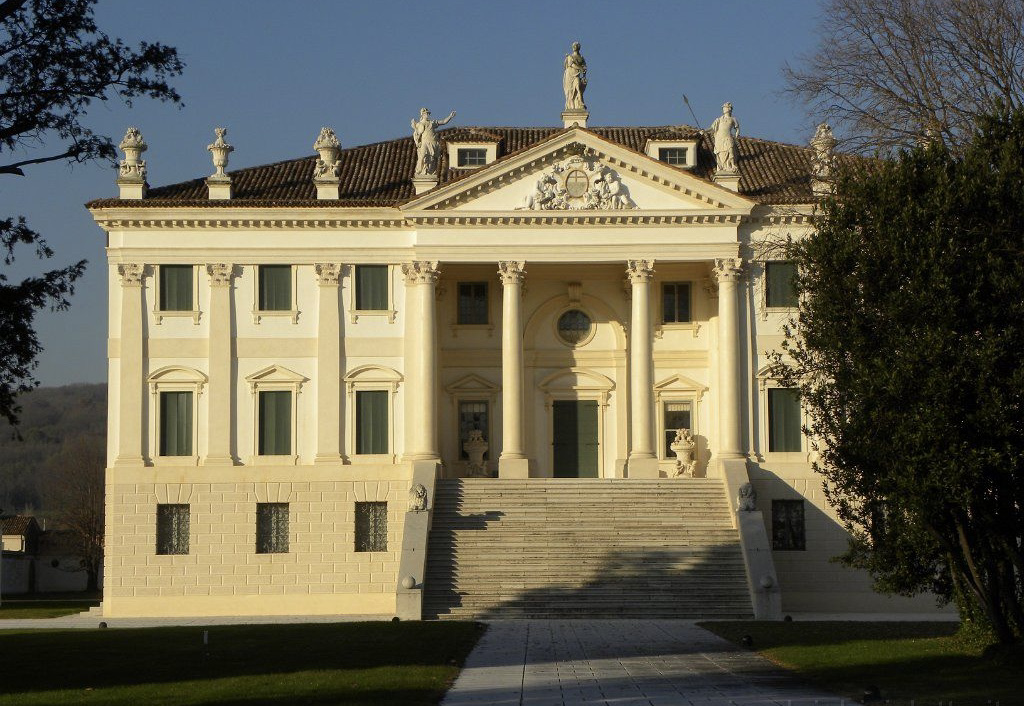
Villa Spineda Loredan

The design of the villa dates back to 1753, when it was commissioned to the architect Giovanni Miazzi by Marcantonio Spineda de Cattaneis, an exponent of the Treviso nobility. The design, however, was largely modified by Francesco Maria Preti, former designer of the Cathedral of Castelfranco Veneto and the Villa Pisani in Stra, in order to achieve greater control over the proportions (according to the rules he established in the 1780 Elements of Architecture treaty). It was Miazzi, however, who completed the building, without making further changes to the master's project.

In the early twentieth century, senator Jacopo Gasparini set up a museum of African relics on the ground floor of the west barn, decorating the environment in a neo-Egyptian style. The artifacts had been acquired during his long diplomatic experience as governor of Eritrea and ambassador to Yemen. In the 1950s, in the part of the estate towards Montello, the subsequent owner Count Piero Loredan (son of Lia Gasparini, daughter and heir of Jacopo) also founded a wine estate, called Conte Loredan Gasparini, which was then separated from the villa and sold to the current owners in 1973. At the end of the century the villa was bought by Benetton, on whose behalf it was completely restored by Afra and Tobia Scarpa, as part of a project aimed at creating the headquarters of the Sportsystem project of the fashion group.

With the loss of direct commitment of the Ponzano Veneto group in the sports sector, in 2008 the villa was purchased by Veneto Banca for the expansion of its management structures and, after its liquidation, became property of Intesa Sanpaolo which, however, did not have a vision for its use and the villa is now occasionally granted for public events.

== Description ==
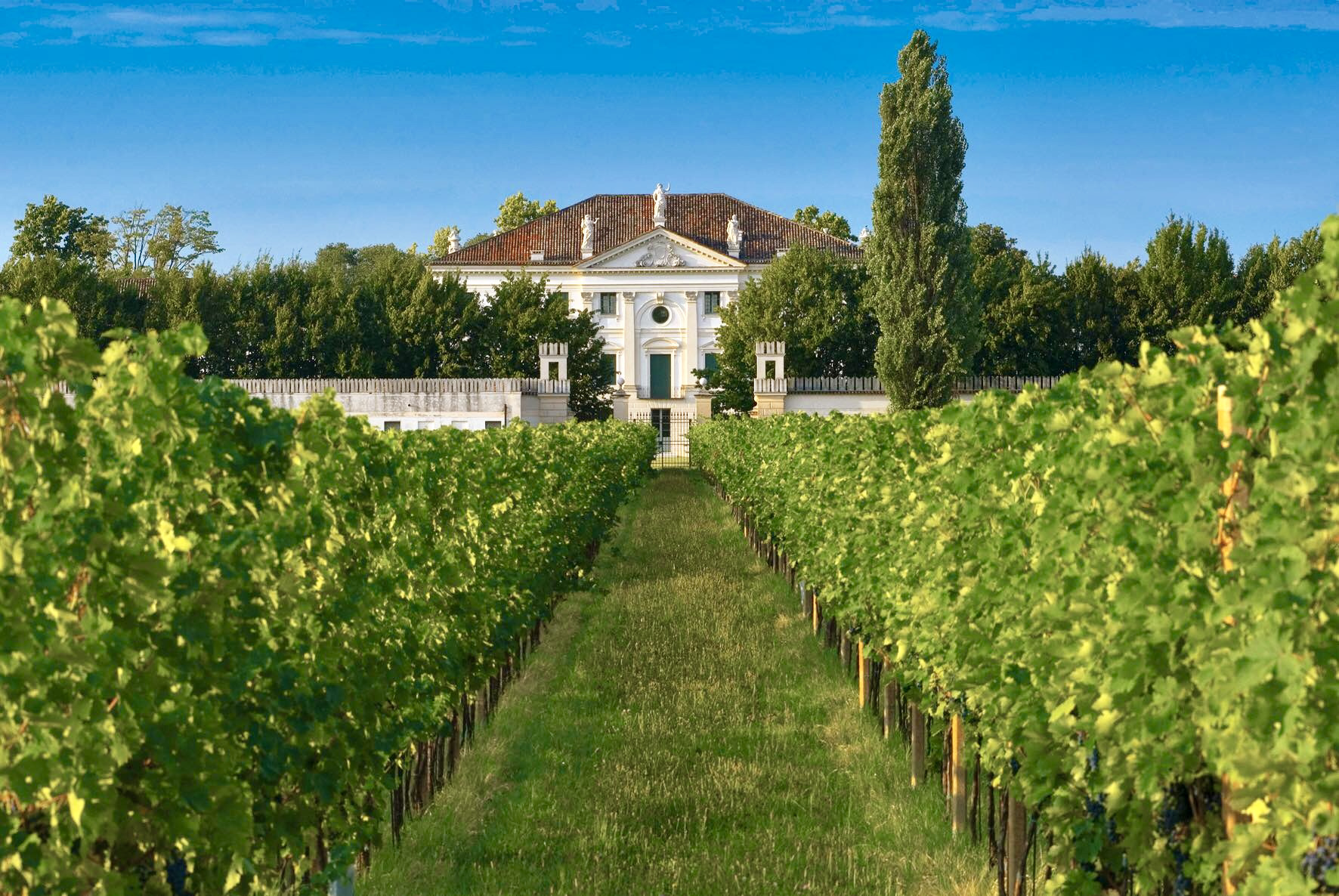
Villa Spineda Loredan and the Conte Loredan Gasparini winery

The complex, framed at the rear by the greenery of Montello, follows a symmetrical layout that sees the main body isolated in the center, two independent lateral barchesse and an adjoining chapel, characterized by a circular plan with a dome.

The body of the building is typically Palladian, arranged on three floors, with a composite tetrastyle portico surmounted by a tympanum, surmounted by three statues and containing the coat of arms of the Spineda family. The two side wings have the façade embellished with pilasters, between which there are three orders of single-light windows with aedicule.

The barchesse have three round arches in the center, flanked by two levels of single lancet windows. The arches are divided by semi-columns with composite capitals, which support a molded entablature, on which the volute ashlars are welded in keystone.

Both the barns and the central body throughout the ground floor are treated with ashlar.

Internally, in the hall the external architectures are repeated, while in the side rooms there are stuccoes with Venetian seminato floors. As part of the restoration, a large room was created under the garden, almost the same size, used by Veneto Banca for its shareholders' meetings. Access is from inside the side barns and from the external sides equipped with emergency exits.

Originally the garden was externally characterized by water features and a wood in the southern area; to the north, towards Montello, there was an extensive orchard. The large architectural complex is surrounded by a fish pond and a high wall, once decorated with frescoes, covered in the latest restoration.

To make the site even more spectacular, both to the north and to the south, a wide avenue of cypress poplars, used as a riding school, crossed the properties. Even today, along Via Sant'Eurosia (parallel to the main road), you can see the two cedars that formed the end of the long avenue.

== Depictions in art ==
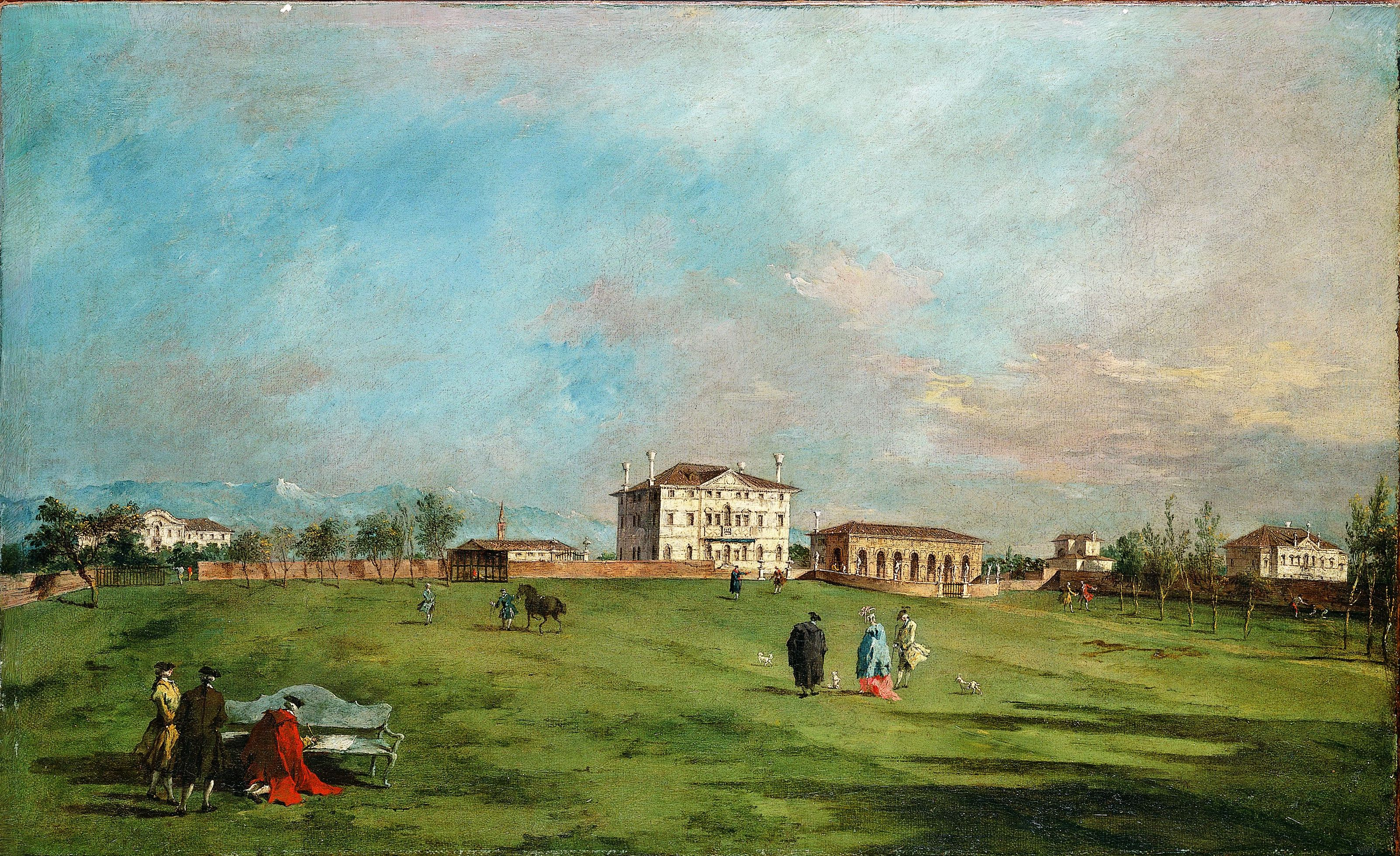
Villa Loredan at Paese, by Francesco Guardi, Metropolitan Museum of Art, New York City

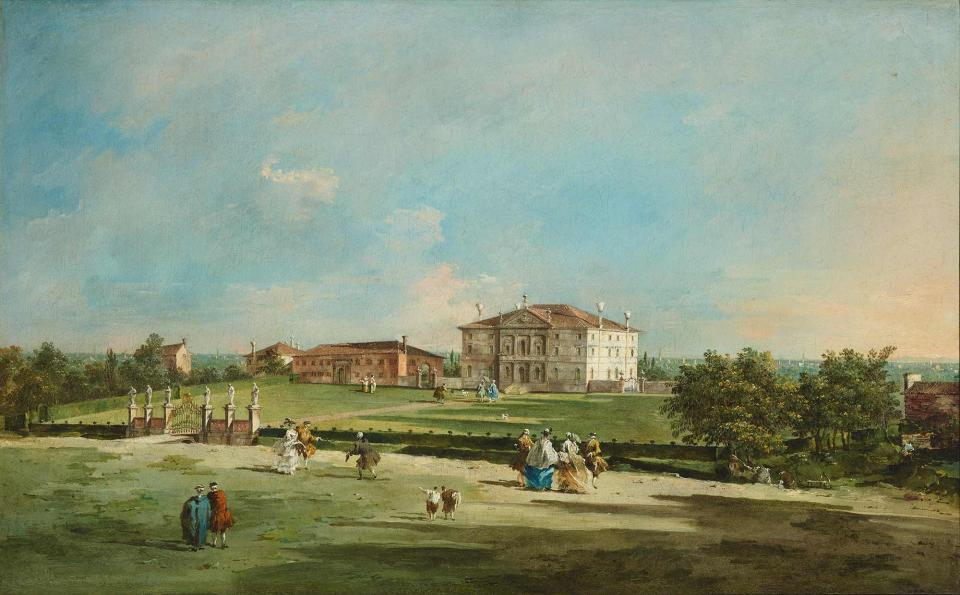
Villa Loredan at Paese, by Francesco Guardi, The Frick Collection, New York City

== Bibliography ==
- AA VV, Ville venete: la provincia di Treviso, a.c. di Chiovaro, Pratali Maffei, Ulmer, Marsilio editore, 2001
- Monicelli, Montagner, Guida alle ville venete, 2000, Demetra editore.
- A. Facchin, C. Poli, Una Guida al percorso dello Stradòn del Bosco, 2007, Provincia di Treviso
