= Villa Corner della Regina =

Building in Cavasagra, Italy

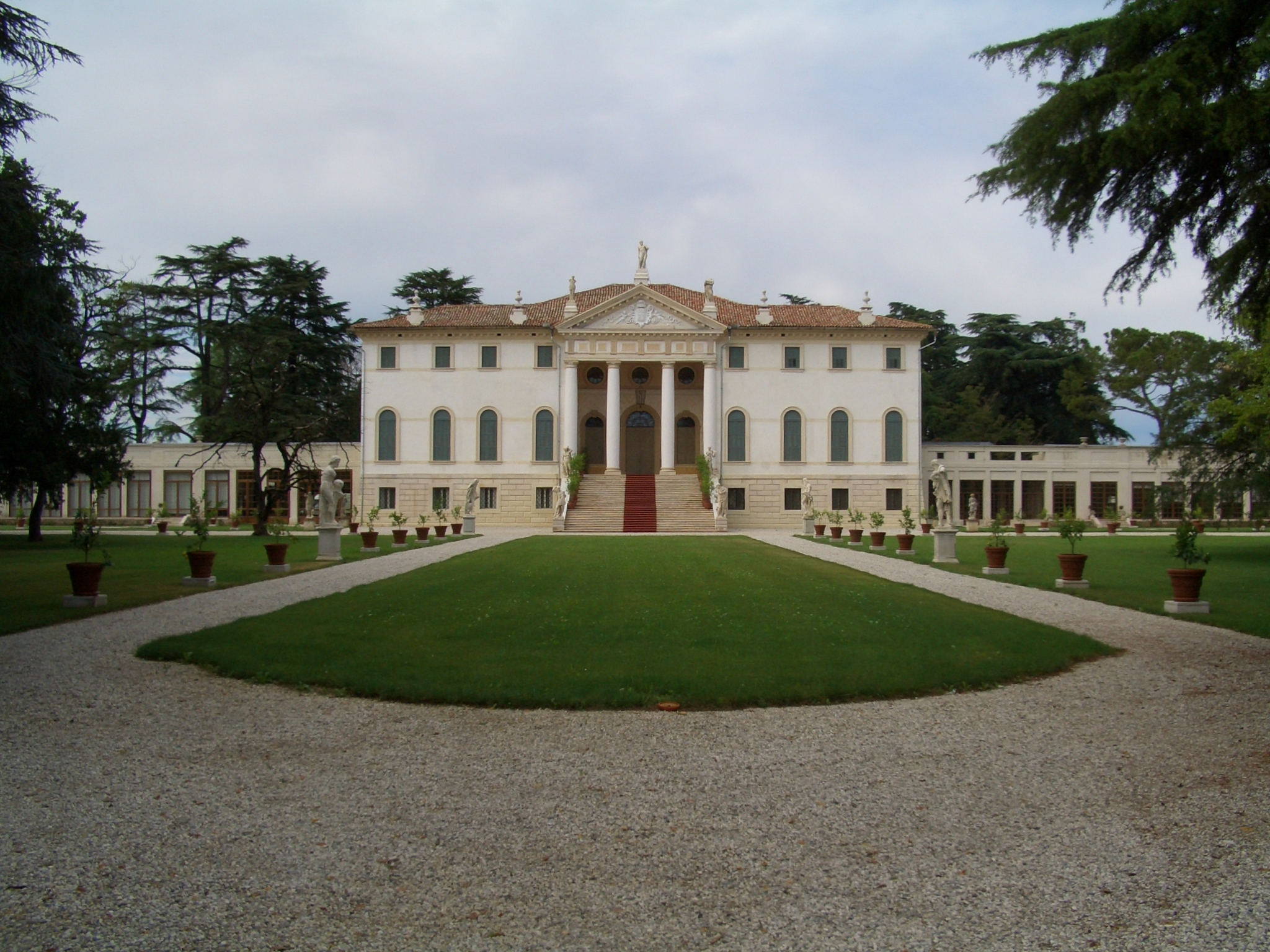

Villa Cornèr della Regina is a Venetian villa in Cavasagra, Province of Treviso, Italy.

== History ==
The building was started in 1500 probably under the supervision of Vincenzo Scamozzi. In 1700 it underwent alterations by Giovanni Cornèr, bishop of Castelfranco Veneto, who commissioned the architects Giovanni Miazzi, Muttoni and Francesco Maria Preti. The Villa, with the addition of the Palladian style portico, then took on its appearance of today. The barchessa outbuildings were also built in the same period.

In 1918, the Villa was occupied by General Enrico Caviglia, commander of the VIII and X army corps. In 1968, Sir Stafford Sands purchased Villa Cornèr from the Orefice family, after which the ex-governor of the Bahamas restored it, adding the current swimming pool and tennis courts. In 1980, an important Venetian family restored the Villa with the barchessa, the park with 32 statues (works by Orazio Marinali) and 11 hectares of vineyards.
