= Girolamo Saladini =

Italian mathematician

Girolami Saladini
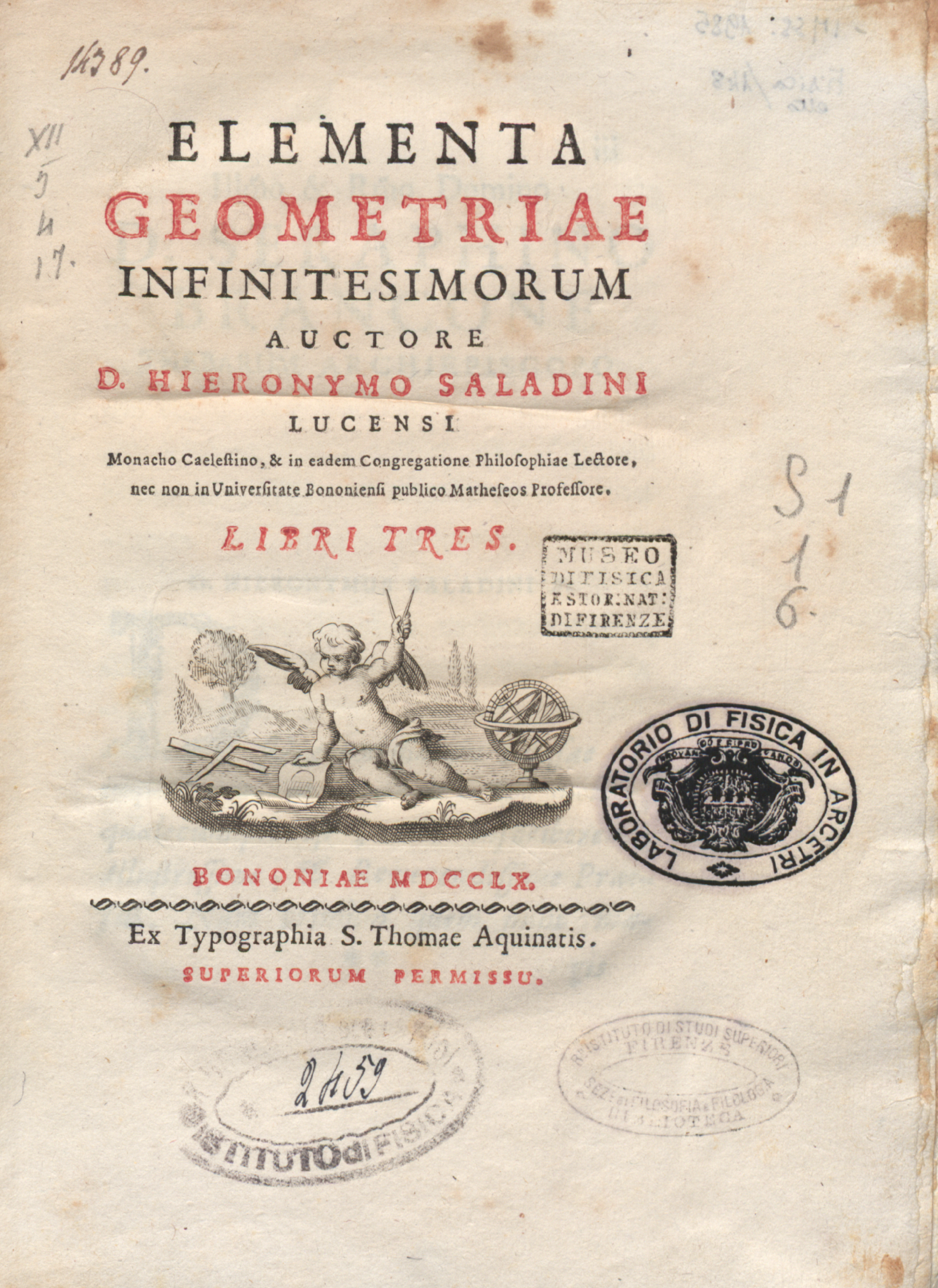
- Elementa geometriae infinitesimorum, 1760
- Born: 22 July 1735; Lucca, Republic of Lucca
- Died: 1 June 1813 (aged 77); Bologna, Papal States
- Occupation: mathematician
- Scientific career
- Institutions: University of Bologna
- Academic advisors: Vincenzo Riccati

Girolamo Saladini (Lucca, 22 July 1735 – Bologna, 1 June 1813) was an Italian mathematician.

== Biography ==
Saladini was one of the brightest pupils of the Italian mathematician Vincenzo Riccati, with whom he had a fruitful collaboration: together they wrote the Institutiones analyticae, an extensive treatise on mathematical analysis published in three volumes in Bologna in 1765–1767. In 1775, Saladini published an Italian translation of the work.

Saladini taught geometry, astronomy and higher mathematics at the University of Bologna. He was an early member of the Accademia nazionale delle scienze. He published many articles, works and memoirs in various specialized Italian publications.

In a memoir written by himself and dated 1808, entitled Sul principio delle velocità virtuali ("On the principle of virtual speeds"), starting from the work carried out by the mathematicians Vittorio Fossombroni and Vincenzo Angiulli, he tried to prove the Principle of Virtual Work by trying to avoid the main difficulties, including the presence of constraints.

== Works ==
- Elementa geometriae infinitesimorum (in Latin). Bologna: Stamperia di S. Tommaso d'Aquino Bologna. 1760.
- Nuovo metodo delle proporzioni geometrica, aritmetica ed armonica. Bologna. 1761.
- Girolamo Saladini; Vincenzo Riccati (1765). Institutiones analyticae (in Latin). Bologna: Stamperia di S. Tommaso d'Aquino Bologna.
- Intorno ad un nuovo metodo di determinare l'orbite delle comete. Stamperia di S. Tommaso d'Aquino Bologna. 1770.
- Compendio d'analisi. In Bologna: Stammperia di S. Tommaso d'Aquino Bologna. 1775.
- Sul principio delle velocità virtuali, Memoria dell'Istituto Nazionale Italiano, t. II, par. la, pp. 399–420, Bologna, 1808.
