= A Biography of Maria Gaetana Agnesi =

2008 book by Antonella Cupillari

- Book cover, first edition
- Author: Antonella Cupillari
- Language: English
- Publisher: Edwin Mellen Press
- Publication date: 28 April 2008
- ISBN: 978-0773452268

A Biography of Maria Gaetana Agnesi, an Eighteenth-Century Woman Mathematician: With Translations of Some of Her Work from Italian into English is a biography of Italian mathematician and philosopher Maria Gaetana Agnesi (1718–1799). It was written and translated by Antonella Cupillari, with a foreword by Patricia R. Allaire, and published in 2008 by the Edwin Mellen Press.

== Topics ==
The main part of the book, over 100 pages, is a translation into English of an Italian-language biography of Agnesi, Elogio storico di Donna Maria Gaetana Agnesi, which was written in the year of her death by historian Antonio Francesco Frisi and republished in 1965. It covers the cultural background that allowed her to become a mathematician, and her brief mathematical career from her teens to her thirties, as well as her work caring for the needy in the remaining fifty years of her life.

Frisi was a family friend of Agnesi. He was the first to write a biography about her. To balance this material with a more objective view of Agnesi, Cupillari has added over 50 pages of notes, derived from two more Italian-language biographies of Agnesi, Maria Gaetana Àgnesi (Luisa Anzoletti, 1900) and Maria Gaetana Agnesi (Giovanna Tilche, 1984). Another large section includes translations and explanations of excerpts from Agnesi's mathematical textbook, Institutioni Analitiche (1748), which was "the first textbook to provide a unified treatment of algebra, Cartesian geometry and calculus", and by being written in vernacular Italian rather than Latin was aimed at a wider audience than the educated scholars of her day. Cupillari concludes her biography with a bibliography of material about Agnesi.

== Audience and reception ==
Reviewers Luigi Pepe and Franka Bruckler recommend the book as a "useful introduction" and "unique, comprehensive source" on Agnesi and her work, particularly for people who read English but not Italian. Bruckler includes among its potential readers historians of mathematics, mathematics educators, and members of the public. Reviewer Edith Mendez describes the book as "an easy read", and its mathematics as accessible to undergraduate mathematics students, but this is contradicted by Peter Ruane, who found the "fragmented" and "eulogistic" first part difficult to follow and to stomach. Mendez also criticizes the book for being inadequately copyedited, and Ruane suggests that the book would have been improved by more context of what was happening in mathematics in Europe at the time.
