= Paolo Frisi =

Italian mathematician and astronomer (1728–1784)

Paolo Frisi FRS
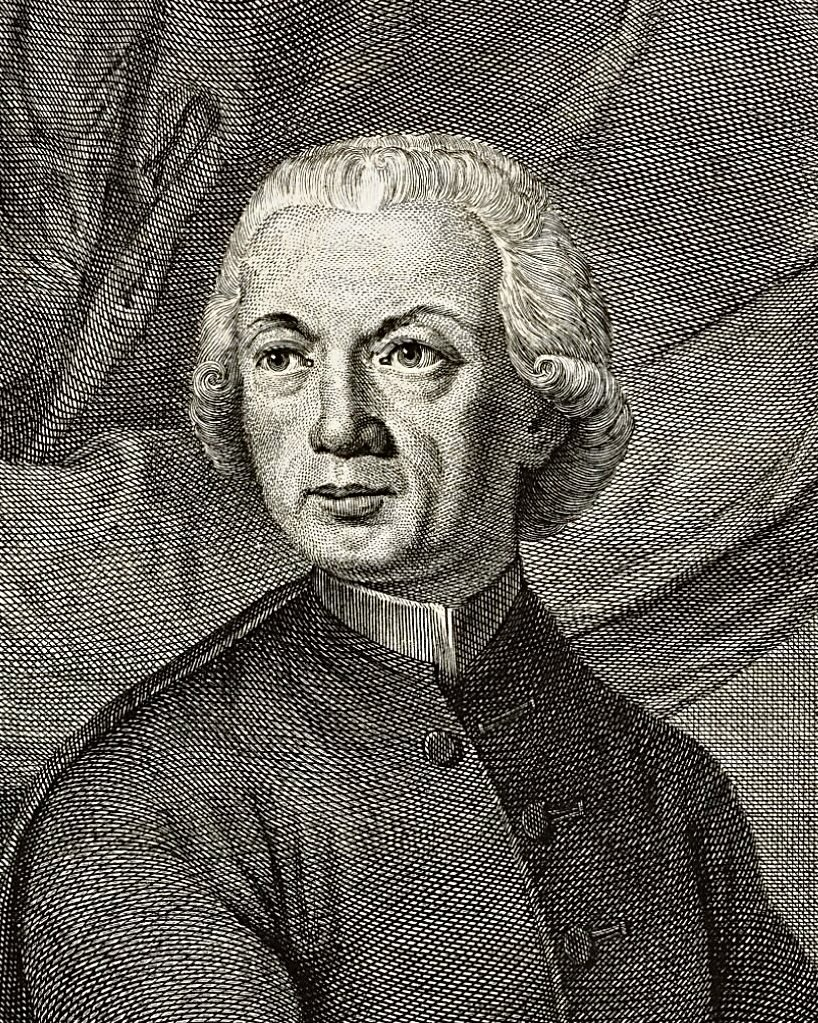
- Portrait of Paolo Frisi by Andrea Appiani (Detail)
- Born: Giuseppe Frisi; 13 April 1728; Melegnano, Duchy of Milan
- Died: 22 November 1784 (aged 56); Milan, Duchy of Milan
- Resting place: Sant'Alessandro in Zebedia
- Parent(s): Giovanni Mattia Frisi and Francesca Frisi (née Magnetti)
- Relatives: Antonio Francesco Frisi (brother)
- Scientific career
- Fields: Astronomy; Mathematics
- Workplaces: Palatine Schools; University of Pisa
- Notable students: Barnaba Oriani; Felice Fontana

Ecclesiastical career
- Religion: Christianity
- Church: Catholic Church
- Ordained: February 1751

Paolo Frisi CRSP FRS (13 April 1728 – 22 November 1784) was an Italian priest, mathematician and astronomer. Frisi's work laid the foundation for understanding angular velocity as a vector, which is crucial in analyzing rotational dynamics.

== Biography ==
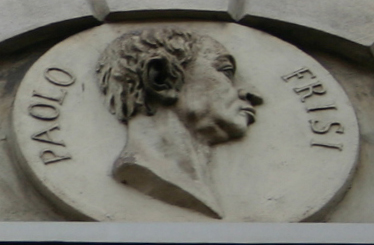
A 19th century medallion of Paolo Frisi on the facade of Palazzo Beccaria in via Brera street, Milan (birthplace of Cesare Beccaria)

Frisi was born in Melegnano in 1728; his sibling Antonio Francesco, born in 1735, went on to be a historian. Frisi was educated at the local Barnabite monastery and afterwards in that of Padua. When twenty-one years of age he composed a treatise on the figure of the earth, and the reputation which he soon acquired led to his appointment by the King of Sardinia to the professorship of philosophy in the College of Casale. He succeeded Hyacinthe Sigismond Gerdil, who had been appointed professor of philosophy at the University of Turin. His friendship with Radicati, a man of liberal opinions, occasioned Frisi's removal by his clerical superiors to Novara, where he was compelled to do duty as a preacher.

In 1753 he was elected a corresponding member of the Paris Academy of Sciences, and shortly afterwards he became professor of philosophy at the Barnabite College of St Alexander at Milan. An acrimonious attack by a young Jesuit, about this time, upon his dissertation on the figure of the earth laid the foundation of his animosity against the Jesuits, with whose enemies, including Jean d'Alembert, J. A. N. Condorcet and other Encyclopedists, he later closely associated himself. As an astronomer Frisi gained international recognition for his studies on the daily movement of the earth. His De motu diurno terrae, published in 1756, was awarded a prize by the Prussian Academy of Sciences. In 1756 he was appointed by Leopold, Grand Duke of Tuscany, to the professorship of mathematics in the university of Pisa, a post which he held for eight years. In 1756 he became an associate of the St. Petersburg Academy of Sciences, and a foreign member of the Royal Society of London, and in 1758 a member of the Academy of Berlin, in 1766 of the Royal Swedish Academy of Sciences, and in 1770 of the Academies of Copenhagen and of Bern. From several European crowned heads he received, at various times, marks of special distinction, and the empress Maria Theresa granted him a yearly pension of 100 sequins.

In 1764 he was created professor of mathematics in the palatine schools at Milan, and obtained from Pope Pius VI the release from ecclesiastical jurisdiction, and authority to become a secular priest. In the same year he began contributing the literary magazine Il Caffè, founded by his friend Pietro Verri. In 1766 he visited France and England, and in 1768 Vienna. His knowledge of hydraulics caused him to be frequently consulted with respect to the management of canals and other watercourses in various parts of Europe. It was through his means that lightning conductors were first introduced into Italy for the protection of buildings.

He died in Milan on 22 November 1784 and was buried in the Church of Sant'Alessandro in Zebedia. Several colleges in Italy are named after him.

== Works ==
- De motu diurno terrae (in Latin). Pisa: Giovanni Paolo Giovannelli & C. 1756.
- Piano de' lavori da farsi per liberare, e assicurare dalle acque le provincie di Bologna, di Ferrara, e di Ravenna. In Lucca: per Vincenzo Giuntini, a spese di Giovanni Riccomini. 1761.
- Del modo di regolare i fiumi, e i torrenti, principalmente del bolognese, e della Romagna. In Lucca: per Vincenzo Giuntini, a spese di Giovanni Riccomini. 1762.
- De gravitate universali corporum (in Latin). Milano: Giuseppe Galeazzi. 1768.
- De' canali navigabili trattato del P. D. Paolo Frisi. In Firenze: nella Stamperia Granducale per Gaetano Cambiagi. 1770.
- Cosmographiae physicae et mathematicae (in Latin). Milano: Giuseppe Marelli. 1775.
- Instituzioni di meccanica, d'idrostatica, d'idrometria e dell'architettura statica e idraulica (in Italian). Milano: Giuseppe Galeazzi. 1777.
- Elogio del cavaliere Isacco Newton. 1778.
- Elogio del signor D'Alembert. In Milano: appresso Giuseppe Galeazzi regio stampatore. 1786.
- Algebra e geometrica analitica (1782)
- Meccanica (1783)
- Saggio della morale filosofica. Lugano: Stamperia della Suprema Superiorità Elvetica. 1755.
- Elogio di Galileo Galilei e di Bonaventura Cavalieri. In Milano: per Giuseppe Galeazzi, Regio Stampatore. 1778.

== See also ==
- 19523 Paolofrisi, asteroid named after him
- List of Roman Catholic scientist-clerics

== Bibliography ==
- O'Connor, John J.; Robertson, Edmund F., "Paolo Frisi", MacTutor History of Mathematics Archive, University of St Andrews
- Verri, Pietro (1787). Memorie Appartenenti Alla Vita Ed Agli Studj Del Signor Don Paolo Frisi. Milan: Giuseppe Marelli.
- Agostini, Amedeo (1932). "FRISI, Paolo". Enciclopedia Italiana. Rome: Istituto dell'Enciclopedia Italiana.
- Boffito, Giuseppe (1933). Scrittori barnabiti o della Congregazione dei chierici regolari di San Paolo (1533-1933). Vol. II. Florence: Leo S. Olschki. pp. 72–98.
- Tomani, Silvana (1964). "La discussione intorno alla gravità nelle 'Institutiones Physicae' di Paolo Frisi". Rivista Critica di Storia della Filosofia. 19 (3): 295–309. JSTOR 44021036.
- Gentili, A. (1987). "Paolo Frisi barnabita". In G. Barbarisi (ed.). Ideologia e scienza nell'opera di Paolo Frisi (1728-1784). Vol. II. Milan: Franco Angeli. pp. 7–30.
- Tubaro, Paola (2002). "A case study in early mathematical economics: Pietro Verri and Paolo Frisi, 1772". Journal of the History of Economic Thought. 24 (2): 195–214. doi:10.1080/10427710220134367.
- D’Amore, Manuela (2019). "Anglo-Italian interdisciplinary networks 1765-1767. Frisi, Beccaria, the Verris and the Fellows of the Royal Society". Diciottesimo Secolo. 4: 47–55.
