= Louis Yolando Mazzini =

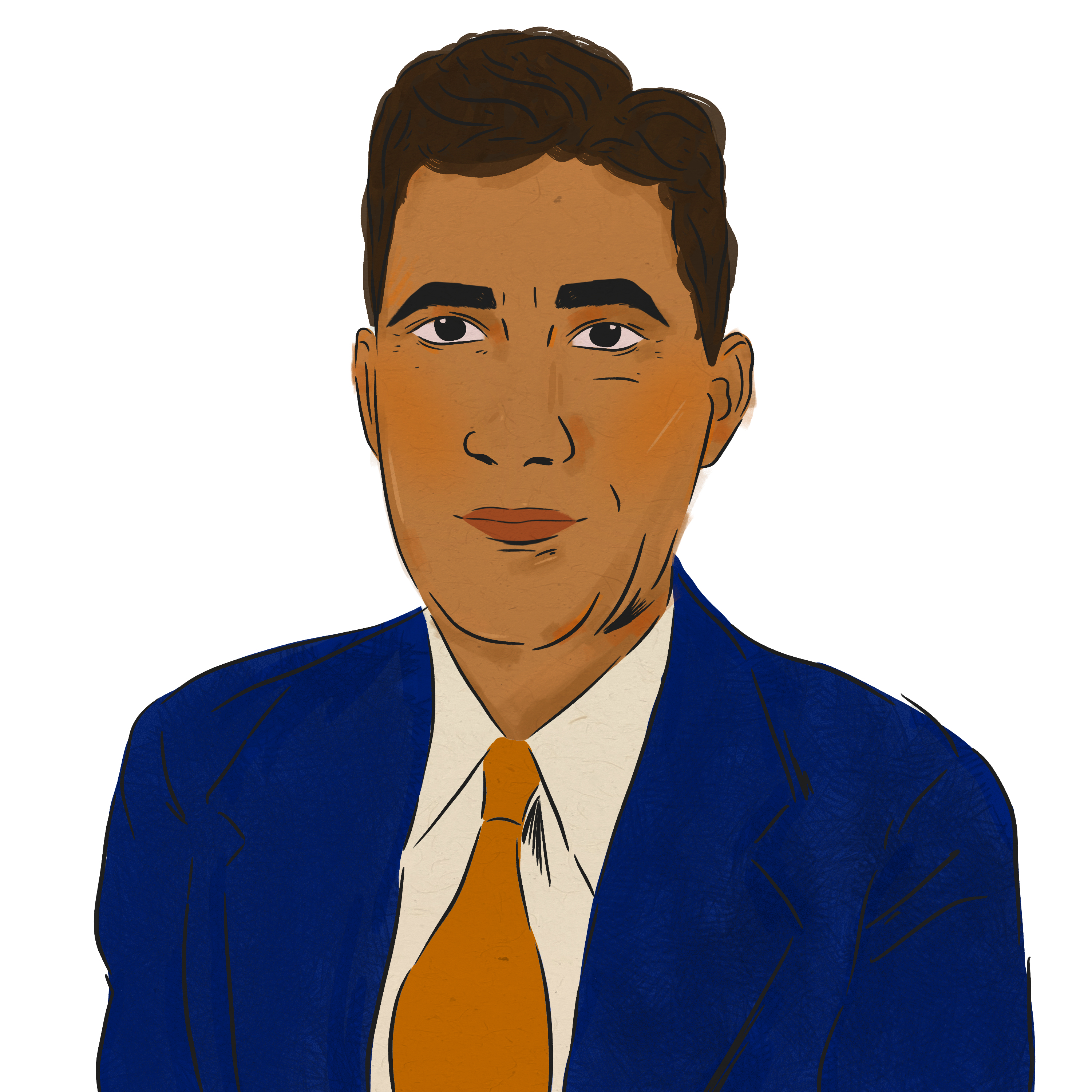
- Illustration of Louis Yolando Mazzini created by Julia Sorrenti
- Born: June 3, 1894; Lima, Peru
- Died: June 23, 1973 (aged 79)
- Burial place: Crown Hill Cemetery and Arboretum, Community Mausoleum, Lot B-D-26; 39.827743°N 86.1716194°W
- Occupation: Serologist
- Known for: For developing the Mazzini test for syphilis (lipoidal flocculation test)

Louis Yolando Mazzini (3 June 1894 – 23 June 1973) was a Peruvian-American scientist, who worked as a professor of serology and pathology at the Indiana University School of Medicine (IUSM) from 1924 to 1965. Originally from Lima, he developed a test for syphilis called the "Mazzini Test" in 1939, which had better specificity than other syphilis tests at the time. He also developed the Mazzini Optical Ground Glass Slide in 1977.

== Early life and education ==
Louis Yolando Mazzini was born on June 3, 1894, in Lima, Peru. He initially moved to the United States to study agriculture at the University of Wisconsin. He resettled in United States in 1916 as a result of instability in Peru. He continued his education at Butler University and Indiana University.

== Career ==
In 1924, Mazzini joined the Indiana University School of Medicine (IUSM) as a professor of serology and pathology. He also worked as a scientist for the Indiana State Board of Health between 1933 and 1947, then set up his own laboratory in 1947.

In 1939, he improved on the existing Wasserman test by developing the Mazzini test—also known as the lipoidal flocculation test—for syphilis. In 1950 he further refined the test by using the cardiolipin antigen to create the Mazzini cardiolipin test. Mazzini's tests were employed by the United States armed forces and by the United States Public Health Service.

Mazzini also owned a restaurant popular among students called the College Inn. He donated the rights to his syphilis tests to the Indiana University Foundation, and a faculty position in pathology at the Indiana University School of Medicine is named after him.

== Death ==
Louis Yolando Mazzini died on June 23, 1973, at the age of seventy-nine. His remains are interred at Crown Hill Cemetery in Indianapolis, Section 212, Lot 316, 39.827743°N 86.1716194°W.
