= Antonio Francesco Frisi =

Italian historian (1733–1817)

- Born: 21 January 1733; Melegnano, Duchy of Milan
- Died: 20 July 1817 (aged 84); Milan, Kingdom of Lombardy–Venetia
- Occupation: canon
- Relatives: Paolo Frisi (brother)

Antonio Francesco Frisi (21 January 1733 – 20 July 1817) was an Italian historian who wrote about the history of Monza.

== Life ==
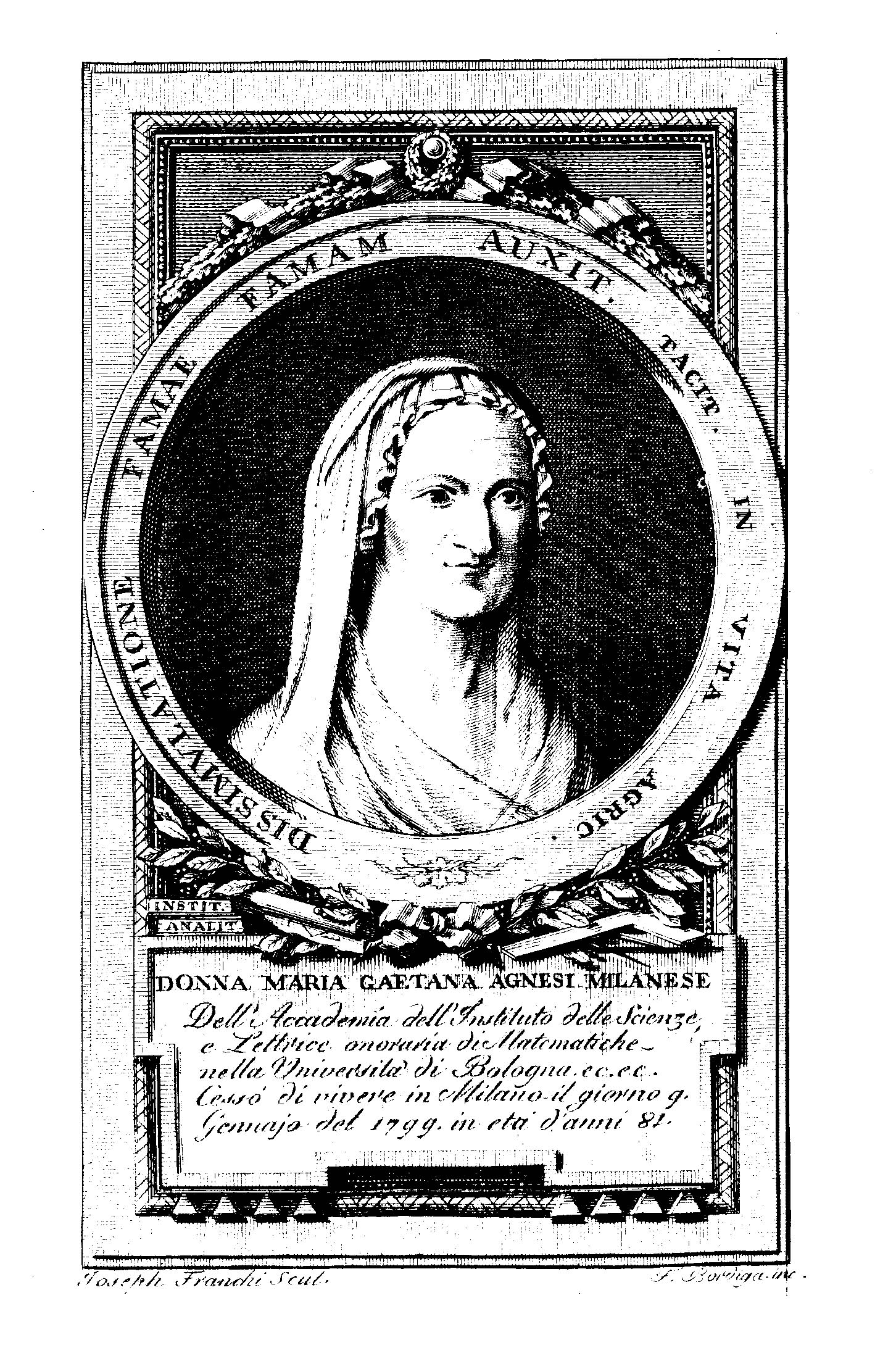
Title page of Frisi's biography of Maria Gaetana Agnesi

Frisi was born in Melegnano in 1733, his brother Paolo Frisi was an astronomer. He wrote from original documents and he is regarded as the first historian of Monza. He became a canon of Milan Cathedral in 1793. He is known for a three volume history Historical memories of Monza and his court which was published in 1794, and for his biography of Maria Gaetana Agnesi, Elogio storico di Donna Maria Gaetana Agnesi, written in 1799 in the year of Agnesi's death. He died in Milan in 1817.

== Bibliography ==
- Volpati, Carlo (1932). "Antonio Frisi". Enciclopedia Italiana. Rome: Istituto dell'Enciclopedia Italiana.
- Fagioli Vercellone, Guido (1998). "FRISI, Anton Francesco". Dizionario Biografico degli Italiani (in Italian). Vol. 50: Francesco 1. Sforza–Gabbi. Rome: Istituto dell'Enciclopedia Italiana. ISBN 978-88-12-00032-6.
