= Antonella Cupillari =

Italian-American mathematician

Antonella Cupillari (born 1955) is an Italian-American mathematician interested in the history of mathematics and mathematics education. She is an associate professor of mathematics at Penn State Erie, The Behrend College.

== Education and career ==
Cupillari earned a laurea at the University of L'Aquila in 1978, and completed her Ph.D. at the University at Albany, SUNY in 1984. Her dissertation, A Small Boundary for $H^{\infty}$ on a Strictly Pseudoconvex Domain, concerned functional analysis, and was supervised by R. Michael (Rolf) Range; she also published it in the Proceedings of the American Mathematical Society.

Cupillari joined the faculty at Penn State Erie in 1984 and was promoted to associate professor in 1992.

== Books ==
Cupillari is the author of books on mathematics and the history of mathematics including:

- The Nuts and Bolts of Proofs (Wadsworth, 1989; 2nd & 3rd eds., Harcourt/Academic Press, 2000 & 2005; 4th ed., Academic Press, 2011)
- Intermediate Algebra in Action (PWS Publishing, 1995)
- A Biography of Maria Gaetana Agnesi, an Eighteenth-Century Woman Mathematician: With Translations of Some of Her Work from Italian into English (Edwin Mellen Press, 2007)

== Recognition ==
Cupillari was the 2008 winner of the Award for Distinguished College or University Teaching of Mathematics of the Allegheny Mountain Section of the Mathematical Association of America.
