= Cupillari Observatory =

Astronomical observatory in Fleetville, Pennsylvania, United States

- Alternative names: Thomas G. Cupillari Observatory
- Organization: Keystone College
- Location: Fleetville, Pennsylvania, United States
- Coordinates: 41.5965°N 75.6780°W
- Website: www.keystone.edu/Observatory/

Thomas G. Cupillari Observatory is an astronomical observatory in Fleetville, Pennsylvania, owned and operated by Keystone College.

The observatory is named after Thomas G. Cupillari, a professor of physics, mathematics, and astronomy at Keystone College. He founded it in 1973 after purchasing its dome and telescope from television personality Dave Garroway. Cupillari retired as a professor in 2007, stepped down as director of the observatory in 2015, and died of cancer in 2021.

== See also ==
- List of astronomical observatories
