= Giovanni Battista Mazzini =

Italian physician and mathematician (1677–1743)

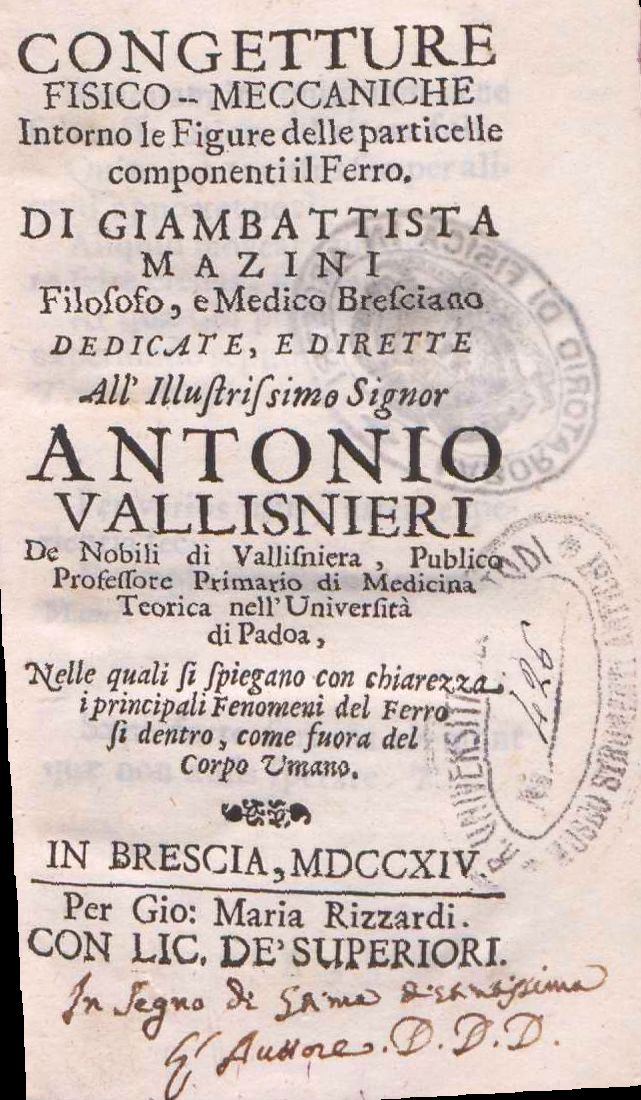
Congetture fisico-meccaniche (1714)

Giovanni Battista Mazzini or Mazini (1677 – 24 May 1743) was an Italian physician, mathematician, and one of the most fervent advocates of the iatromechanical school.

== Works ==
- Congetture fisico-meccaniche intorno le figure delle particelle componenti il ferro (in Italian). Brescia: Giovanni Maria Rizzardi. 1714.
- Mechanices morborum (in Latin). Vol. 1. Brescia: Giovanni Maria Rizzardi. 1723.
- Mechanices morborum (in Latin). Vol. 2. Brescia: Giovanni Maria Rizzardi. 1725.
- Mechanica medicamentorum (in Latin). Brescia: Giovanni Maria Rizzardi. 1734.
