= E. F. Robertson =

British mathematician (born 1943)

E. F. Robertson FRSE
- Born: Edmund Frederick Robertson; 1 June 1943 (age 82); St Andrews, Scotland
- Occupation: Mathematician
- Employer: University of St Andrews
- Known for: Creating the MacTutor History of Mathematics Archive
- Children: 2

Edmund Frederick Robertson (born 1 June 1943) is a British mathematician who is a professor emeritus of pure mathematics at the University of St Andrews.

== Work ==
Robertson is one of the creators of the MacTutor History of Mathematics archive, along with John J. O'Connor. Robertson has written more than 100 research articles, mainly on the theory of groups and semigroups. He is also the author or co-author of 17 textbooks.

Robertson obtained a Bachelor of Science degree at the University of St Andrews in 1965. He then went to the University of Warwick, where he received a Master of Science degree in 1966 and a Doctor of Philosophy degree in 1968.

In 1998, he was elected a Fellow of the Royal Society of Edinburgh.

In 2015, he received together with his colleague O'Connor, the Hirst Prize of the London Mathematical Society for his work on the MacTutor History of Mathematics archive. His thesis on "Classes of Generalised Nilpotent Groups" was done with Stewart E. Stonehewer.

== Personal life ==
He is with his wife, Helena, and his two sons.

== Bibliography ==
- Algebra Through Practice: A Collection of Problems in Algebra with Solutions: Books 4–6 – with T. S. Blyth, ISBN 978-0521253017
- Rings, Fields and Modules – with T. S. Blyth, 1985, ISBN 978-0521272919
- Sets and mappings – with T. S. Blyth, 1986, ISBN 978-0412278808
- Linear Algebra – with T. S. Blyth, 1986, ISBN 978-0412278501
- Essential Student Algebra: Groups – with T. S. Blyth, 1986, ISBN 978-0412278402
- Basic Linear Algebra – with T. S. Blyth, 1998, ISBN 978-3540761228
- Colin MacLaurin (1698–1746): Argyllshire's Mathematician, 2000, ISBN 978-1902847108
- Further Linear Algebra – with T. S. Blyth, 2002, ISBN 978-1852334253
