= MacTutor History of Mathematics Archive =

Mathematics web site

- Website: mathshistory.st-andrews.ac.uk

The MacTutor History of Mathematics Archive is a website maintained by John J. O'Connor and Edmund F. Robertson and hosted by the University of St Andrews in Scotland. It contains detailed biographies on many historical and contemporary mathematicians, as well as information on famous curves and various topics in the history of mathematics.

The History of Mathematics archive was an outgrowth of Mathematical MacTutor system, a HyperCard database by the same authors, which won them the European Academic Software award in 1994. In the same year, they founded their web site. It has since expanded to include biographies of more than 3200 mathematicians and scientists.

In 2015, O'Connor and Robertson won the Hirst Prize of the London Mathematical Society for their work. The citation for the Hirst Prize calls the archive "the most widely used and influential web-based resource in history of mathematics".

== See also ==
- Mathematics Genealogy Project
- MathWorld
- PlanetMath
