= Castelfranco Veneto =

Castelfranco Veneto Casteło (Venetian)
- Comune
- Città di Castelfranco Veneto
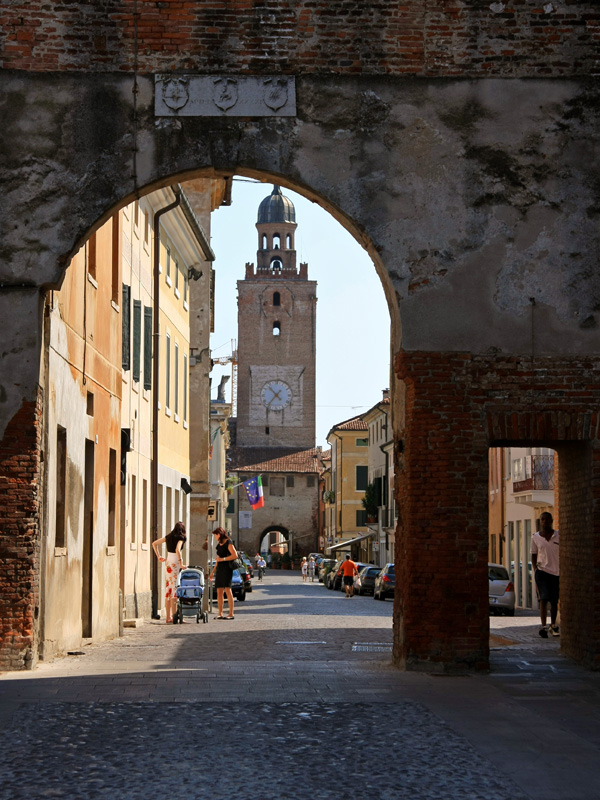
- The western gate of the old historical centre.

- Coat of arms

- Location within Italy Location within Veneto
- Coordinates: 45°40′N 11°56′E
- Country: Italy
- Region: Veneto
- Province: Treviso (TV)
- Frazioni: Treville, Salvarosa, Salvatronda, Bella Venezia, Campigo, Sant'Andrea oltre il Muson, Villarazzo, San Floriano di Campagna

Government
  - Mayor: Maria Wanjera Ghimenton (centre-left)

Area
  - Total: 50.93 km^{2} (19.66 sq mi)
- Elevation: 42 m (138 ft)

Population (31 August 2008)
  - Total: 33,407
  - Density: 655.9/km^{2} (1,699/sq mi)
- Demonym: Castellani
- Time zone: UTC+1 (CET)
  - Summer (DST): UTC+2 (CEST)
- Postal code: 31033
- Dialing code: 0423
- Patron saint: Saint Liberalis
- Saint day: 27 April
- Website: Official website

Castelfranco Veneto is a town and comune (municipality) of Veneto, northern Italy, in the province of Treviso. It is the third largest municipality in the province by population after the capital Treviso and Conegliano. It is centrally located between the cities of Treviso, Padua and Vicenza, it is a walled city with a well-preserved medieval castle.

The city is the birthplace of painter Giorgione, whose house still exists; in a chapel of the city's cathedral, the Pala di Castelfranco is displayed.

== Physical geography ==
=== Territory ===
The municipality of Castelfranco Veneto extends over a completely flat area, located at the western end of the province of Treviso, on the border with the province of Padua. The location is such that it can easily reach four provincial capitals (Treviso, Venice, Vicenza and Padua), as well as other important cities such as Bassano del Grappa, Cittadella and Montebelluna.

Thanks to its privileged position, it is served by a very varied and complete transport network: in fact, three important railway lines converge in the area, which intersect in the city station and two important road arteries, the SS 53 Postumia which connects Vicenza to Treviso, and the SS 245 Castellana between Mestre and Bassano del Grappa.

The main river is the Musone-Muson dei Sassi, but other smaller rivers flow in the territory of the municipality: l'Avenale, il Musoncello, il Musonello and il Muson Vecchio.

There are many fractions into which the city is divided. Castelfranco Veneto represents a commercial and industrial pole of great importance compared to the neighboring municipalities of the province of Treviso.

== History ==
Castelfranco was founded between 1195 and 1199 when the recently formed Municipality of Treviso felt the need to guard the border with rivals Padua and Vicenza, in an area where the Muson river represented the only ephemeral natural demarcation. The site chosen was placed in a strategic position: a pre-existing embankment on the eastern bank of the waterway, close to the confluence of the Postumia and Aurelia streets and in a central position between the lordly fortresses of Castello di Godego and Treville and the episcopal fortresses of Salvatronda, Riese and Resana. The works were directed by Count Schenella di Collalto, who employed about five hundred master masons and a thousand "guastatori" (unskilled workers). In a decade the construction could be said to be complete: a moat was dug around the castle walls into which the waters of two tributaries (resurgence waters) of the Muson were diverted: the Avenale and the Musonello.

Once the castle was erected, the Municipality of Treviso sent a colony of one hundred families of free men there, to whom farms and houses were granted exempt from taxes and encumbrances, hence the toponym Castelfranco: castle, precisely, "free" from taxes . This resulted in the peculiar composition of the castle population, the vast majority of which was not made up of soldiers, but of free citizens. The internal spaces, however, were not organized according to a typical urban plan: there was no real square and the most important buildings were distributed along the main road or even set back, as in the case of the church (at the time subordinate to the older Pieve Nuova, in the current Borgo Pieve), the accounting office and the infirmary.

== Main sights ==
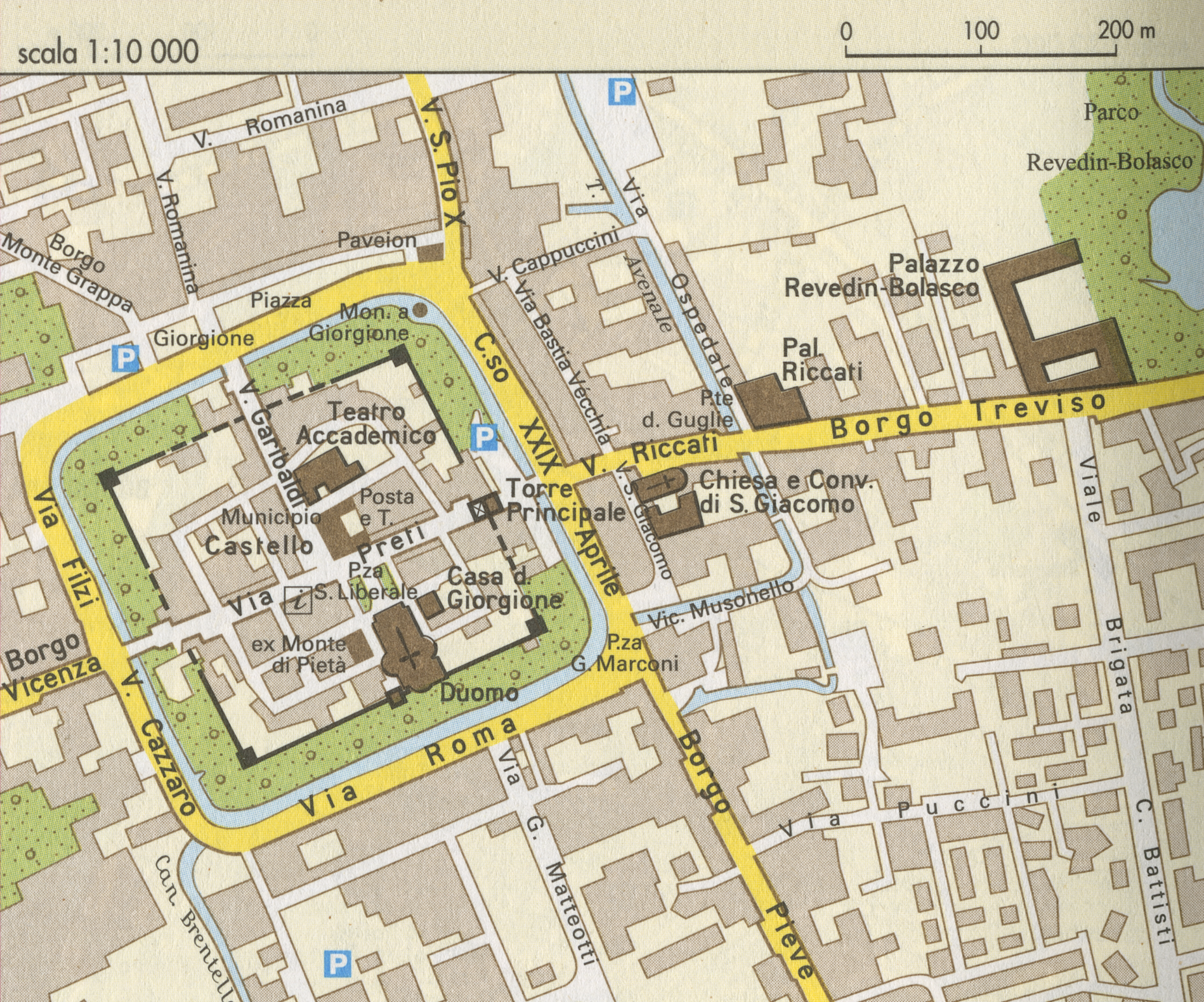
Map of historical centre

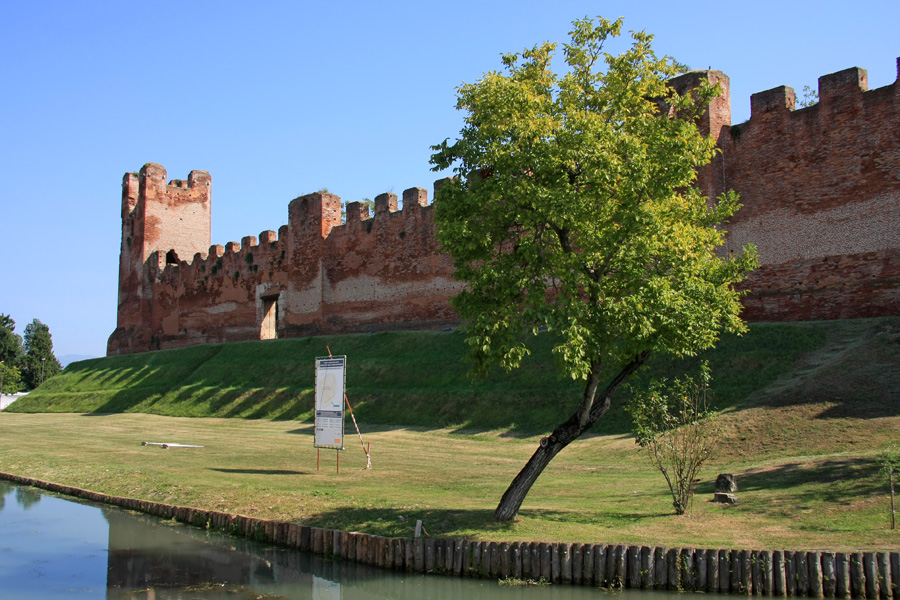
The walls of the old city centre

The older part of the town is square, surrounded by medieval walls and towers constructed by the people of Treviso in 1211 (see Cittadella).

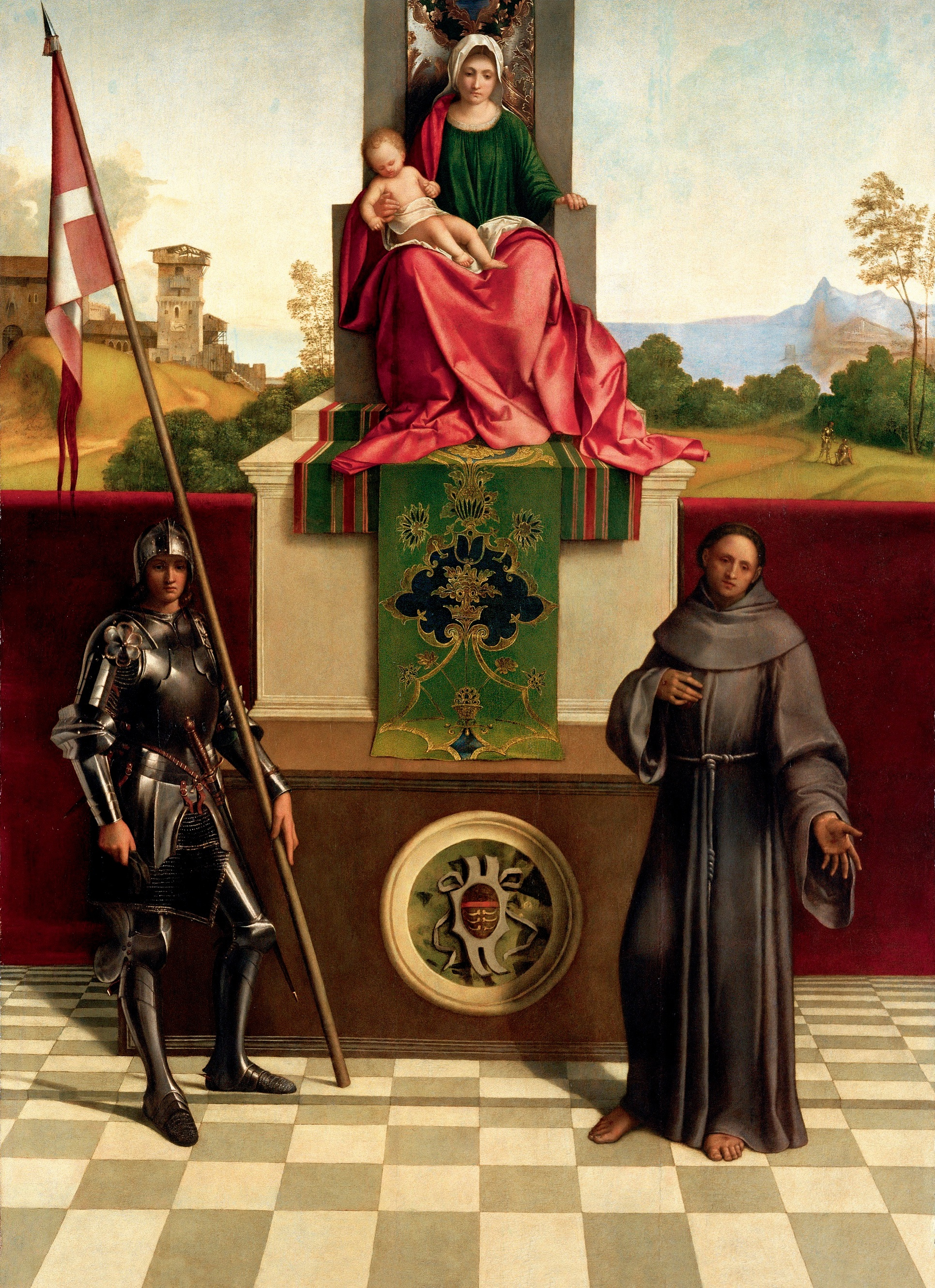
Castelfranco Madonna

Castelfranco Veneto was the birthplace of the painter Giorgione, and the cathedral, named il Duomo (1723), located inside the walls, contains one of his finest works, the Madonna with St. Francis and Liberalis (1504), but more commonly called Pala del Giorgione. In the background, the towers of the old town may be seen. The painting was being restored in Venice, Italy; however, ceremonies were held for the return of 'La Pala' near the end of 2005.

The cathedral itself was designed by Francesco Maria Preti, over an ancient Romanesque church. Other artpieces include seven fragments of frescoes by Paolo Veronese.

== Transport ==
Castelfranco Veneto railway station, opened in 1877, is a junction of three railway lines, the Trento–Venice railway, the Vicenza–Treviso railway and the Calalzo–Padua railway, respectively. As such, it is one of the busiest railway junctions in Veneto.

== Notable people ==
- Giorgione (1477–1510), painter.
- Agostino Steffani (1655–1728), Catholic bishop, diplomat, and composer.
- Francesco Maria Preti (1701–1774), architect.
- Vincenzo Riccati (1707–1775), Catholic priest, mathematician, and physicist.
- Giordano Riccati (1709–1790), mathematician and physicist.
- Paola Drigo (1876–1938), writer.
- Maria Oliva Bonaldo (1893–1976), Catholic nun; founder of the Daughters of the Church.
- Tina Anselmi (1927–2016), member of the Italian resistance movement, later politician, first woman to hold a ministerial position in Italy.
- Donatella Rettore (born 1953), singer and songwriter.
- Francesco Guidolin (born 1955), football manager.
- Mario Brunello (born 1960), cellist.
- Pia Parolin (born 1965), biologist and tropical ecologist.
- Claudio Coldebella (born 1968), basketball player and sport manager.
- Alessandro Ballan (born 1979), cyclist.
- Manuela Giugliano (born 1997), football player.

== Twin towns ==
- Guelph, Ontario, Canada

== Climate ==
Climate data for Castelfranco Veneto (1991–2020)
Month	Jan	Feb	Mar	Apr	May	Jun	Jul	Aug	Sep	Oct	Nov	Dec	Year
Mean daily maximum °C (°F)	7.8 (46.0)	10.0 (50.0)	14.4 (57.9)	18.8 (65.8)	23.9 (75.0)	28.0 (82.4)	30.3 (86.5)	30.2 (86.4)	25.1 (77.2)	19.2 (66.6)	13.2 (55.8)	8.5 (47.3)	19.1 (66.4)
Daily mean °C (°F)	3.3 (37.9)	4.8 (40.6)	8.8 (47.8)	13.1 (55.6)	18.0 (64.4)	21.8 (71.2)	23.7 (74.7)	23.5 (74.3)	19.0 (66.2)	14.1 (57.4)	8.8 (47.8)	4.2 (39.6)	13.6 (56.5)
Mean daily minimum °C (°F)	−1.2 (29.8)	−0.3 (31.5)	3.3 (37.9)	7.5 (45.5)	12.1 (53.8)	15.6 (60.1)	17.2 (63.0)	16.8 (62.2)	12.9 (55.2)	8.9 (48.0)	4.4 (39.9)	−0.2 (31.6)	8.1 (46.5)
Average precipitation mm (inches)	55.1 (2.17)	64.4 (2.54)	68.9 (2.71)	93.3 (3.67)	117.9 (4.64)	106.1 (4.18)	87.7 (3.45)	94.9 (3.74)	115.4 (4.54)	115.1 (4.53)	116.9 (4.60)	81.3 (3.20)	1,117 (43.97)
Average precipitation days (≥ 1.0 mm)	5.8	5.6	6.6	8.9	9.9	8.9	7.3	7.7	8.1	7.7	8.4	7.1	92
Source: Istituto Superiore per la Protezione e la Ricerca Ambientale
