= Castelfranco =

Castelfranco may refer to any of the following:

== Italian towns ==
- Castelfranco Emilia
- Castelfranco in Miscano, in the Province of Benevento in Campania
- Castelfranco di Sotto
- Castelfranco di Sopra, in the Province of Arezzo in Tuscany.
- Castelfranco Veneto

== Military installations ==
- Castelfranco (Finale Ligure)

== Art ==
- Madonna of Castelfranco, a Renaissance masterpiece by Giorgione
