= Castelfranco Veneto railway station =

Railway station in Italy

Castelfranco Veneto
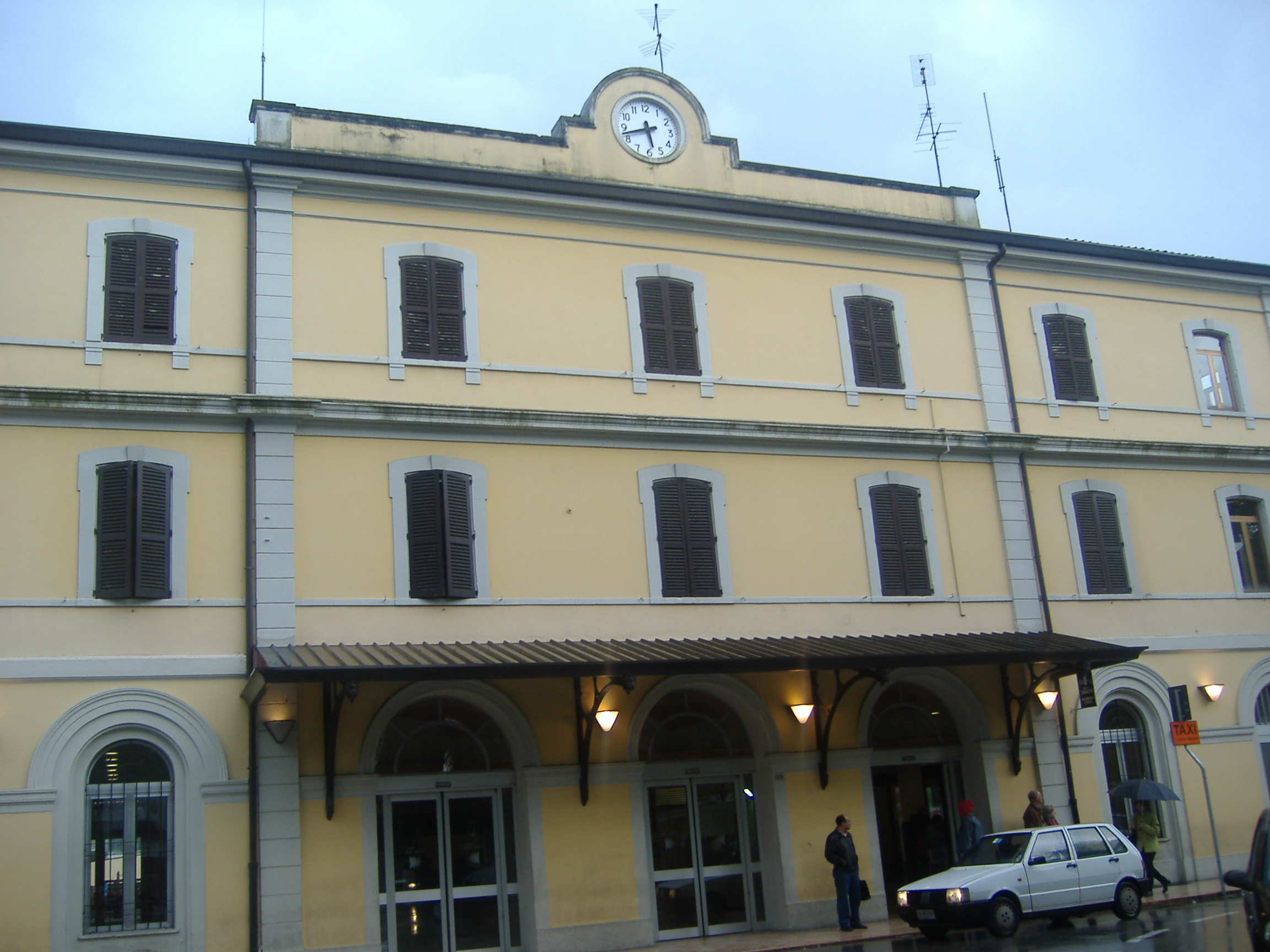
- The entrance to the passenger building.

General information
- Location: Via Natale Melchiori; 31033 Castelfranco Veneto; Castelfranco Veneto, Treviso, Veneto; Italy
- Coordinates: 45°40′00″N 11°56′02″E
- Owner: Rete Ferroviaria Italiana
- Operator: Centostazioni
- Lines: Trento–Venice; Vicenza–Treviso; Calalzo–Padua
- Platforms: 7
- Train operators: Trenitalia
- Connections: Urban and suburban buses

History
- Opened: 16 July 1877; 149 years ago
Location
- Location within Veneto Location within Northern Italy Location within Italy

Castelfranco Veneto railway station (Italian: Stazione di Castelfranco Veneto) serves the town and comune of Castelfranco Veneto, in the Veneto region, northeastern Italy.

Opened in 1877, the station is a junction of three lines, the Trento–Venice railway, the Vicenza–Treviso railway and the Calalzo–Padua railway, respectively. As such, it is one of the busiest railway junctions in the region.

The station is currently owned by Rete Ferroviaria Italiana (RFI). The commercial area of the passenger building is managed by Centostazioni. Train services to and from the station are operated by Trenitalia. Each of these companies is a subsidiary of Ferrovie dello Stato Italiane (FS), Italy's state-owned rail company.

== Features ==
The passenger building is a large three storey structure. Passenger services inside the building include ticketing, a waiting area, and a bar, all on the ground floor.

There are seven tracks running through the station, all of them equipped with platforms connected by a subway. Each platform has a shelter made of iron.

The goods yard has several tracks and a building, and is still partly used. In future, goods movements at the station will probably increase, because of a recent decision to dispose of old wooden sleepers by transporting them north to Sweden.

== Train services ==
The station is served by the following service(s):

- High speed services (Frecciabianca) Milan - Verona - Vicenza - Treviso - Udine
- Regional services (Treno regionale) Vicenza - Citadella - Castelfranco Veneto - Treviso
- Regional services (Treno regionale) Padua - Castelfranco Veneto - Treviso
- Regional services (Treno regionale) Vicenza - Padua - Castelfranco Veneto - Montebelluna - Belluno - Ponte nelle Alpi-Polpet - Calalzo-Pieve di Cadore-Cortina
- Regional services (Treno regionale) Padua - Castelfranco Veneto - Montebelluna
- Regional services (Treno regionale) Bassano del Grappa - Castelfranco Veneto - Venice

== Passenger and train movements ==
The station has about 3.2 million passenger movements each year.
