= Artificial stone =

Class of synthetic stone products

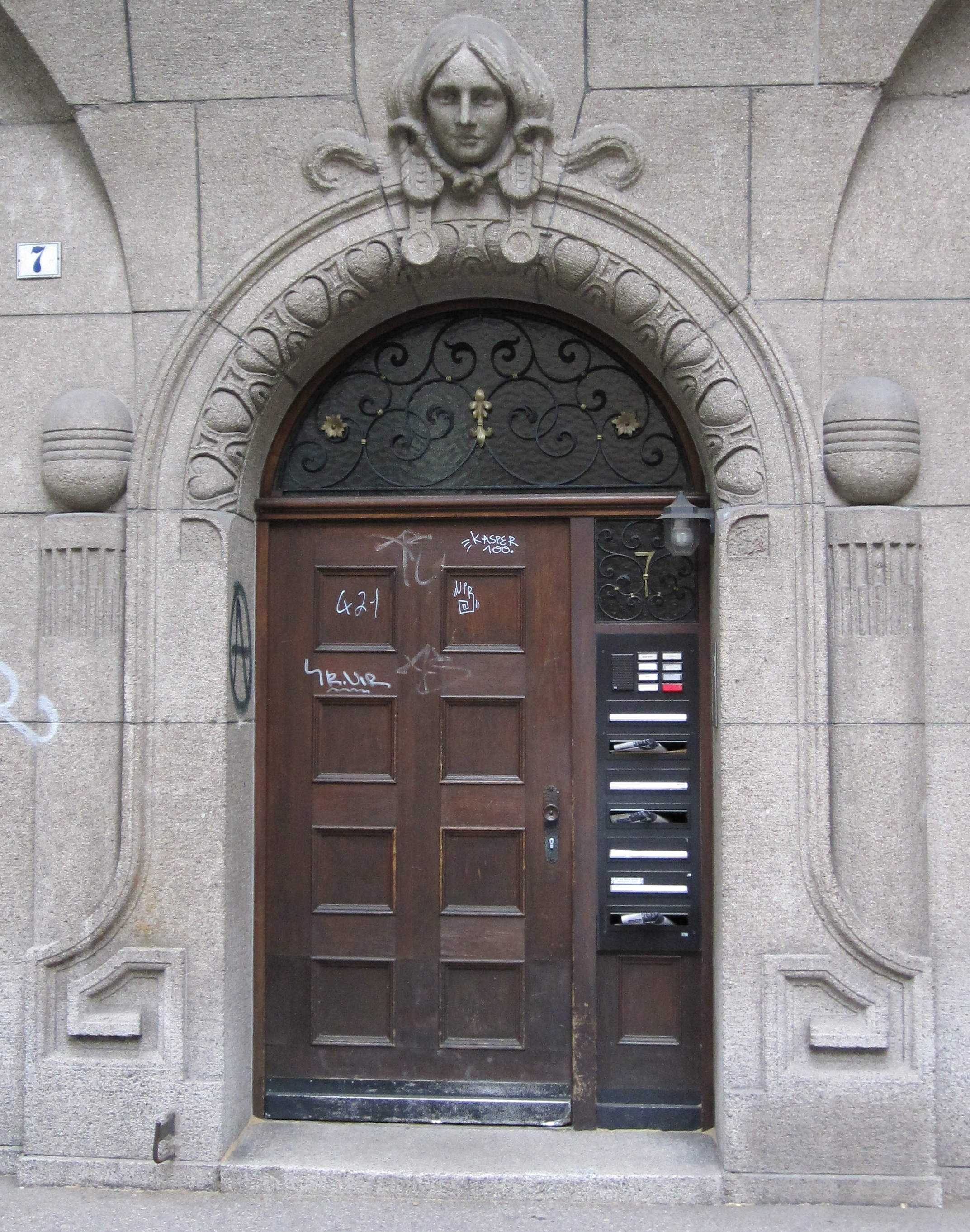
German doorway in cast stone

Artificial stone is a name for various synthetic stone products, typically made of cement, produced commercially from the 18th century onward. Uses include statuary, architectural details, fencing and rails, building construction, civil engineering work, and industrial applications such as grindstones.

== History ==
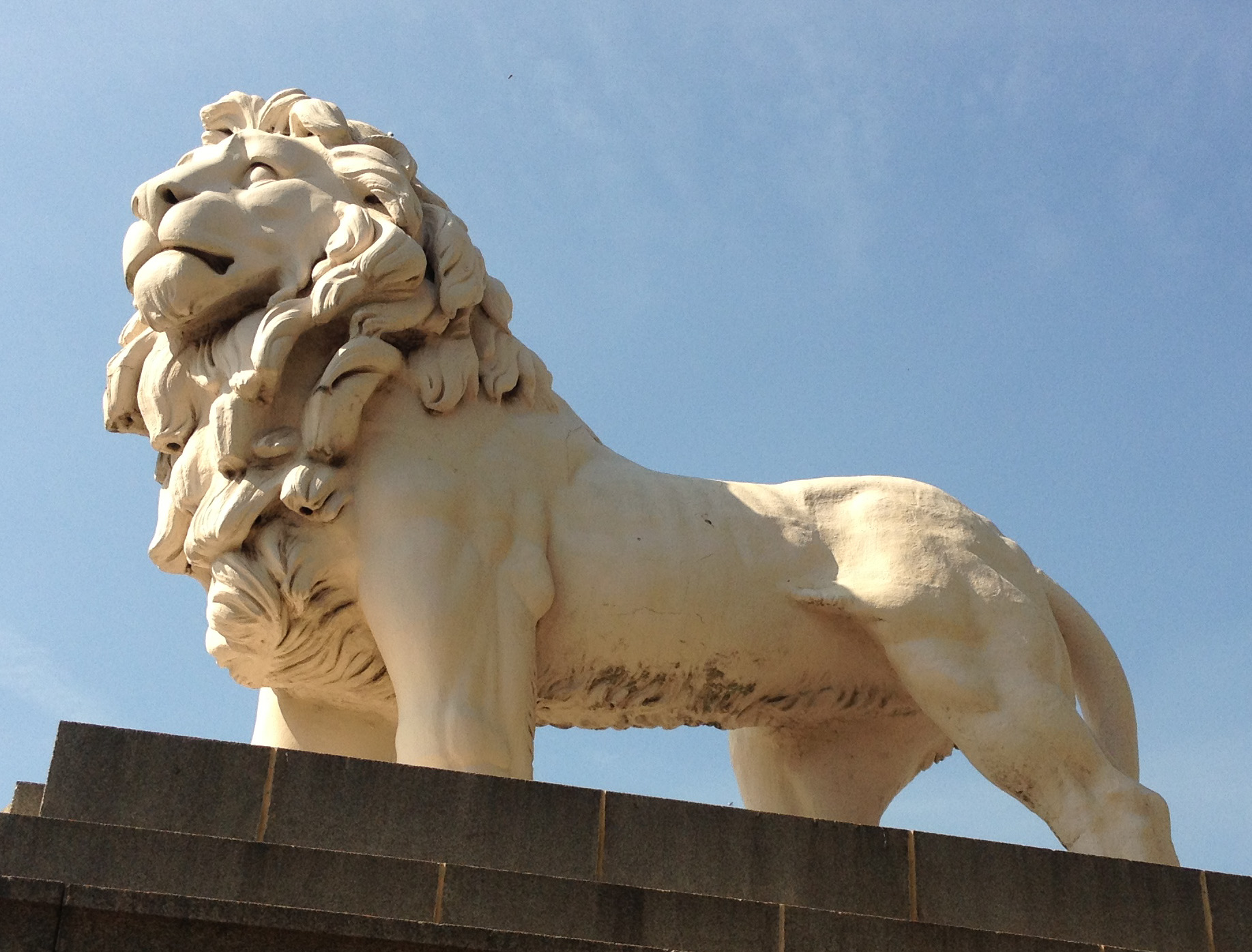
The South Bank Lion in Coade stone, at the south end of Westminster Bridge, London

One of the earliest examples of artificial stone was Coade stone (originally called Lithodipyra), a ceramic created by Eleanor Coade (1733–1821), and produced from 1769 to 1833. Later, in 1844, Frederick Ransome created a Patent Siliceous Stone, which comprised sand and powdered flint in an alkaline solution. By heating it in an enclosed high-temperature steam boiler the siliceous particles were bound together and could be moulded or worked into filtering slabs, vases, tombstones, decorative architectural work, emery wheels and grindstones.

This was followed by Victoria stone, which comprises three parts finely-crushed Mountsorrel (Leicestershire) granite to one of Portland cement, mechanically mixed and cast in moulds. When set the moulds are loosened and the blocks placed in a solution of sodium silicate for about two weeks to indurate and harden them. Many manufacturers turned out a very non-porous product able to resist corrosive sea air and industrial and residential air pollution.

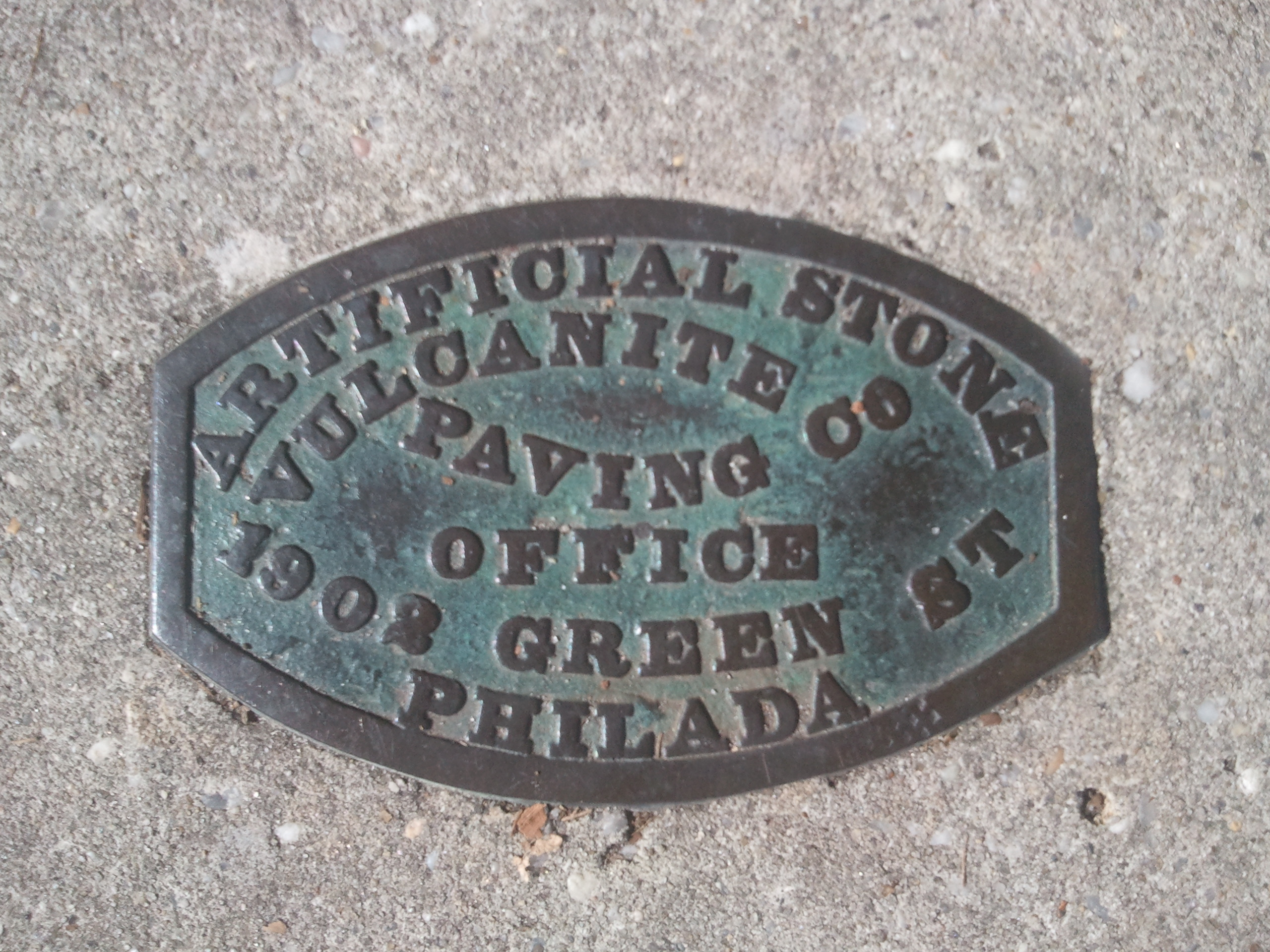
A plaque set in the concrete of a sidewalk on Columbia Avenue in Cape May, New Jersey, US. It reads "Artificial Stone Vulcanite Paving Co, Office 1902 Green St, Philada" [Philadelphia, Pennsylvania, US]. It probably dates to the late 19th or early 20th centuries. (The concrete that currently surrounds it is not the original sidewalk.)

Most later types of artificial stone have consisted of fine-aggregate cement concrete placed to set in wooden or iron moulds. It could be made more cheaply and more uniform than natural stone, and was widely used. In engineering projects, it had the advantage that transporting the bulk materials and casting them near the place of use was cheaper than transporting very large pieces of stone.

Modern cast stone is an architectural concrete building unit manufactured to simulate natural cut stone, used in unit masonry applications. Cast stone is a masonry product, used as an architectural feature, trim, ornament or facing for buildings or other structures. Cast stone can be made from white and/or grey cements, manufactured or natural sands, carefully selected crushed stone or well graded natural gravels and mineral coloring pigments to achieve the desired colour and appearance while maintaining durable physical properties which exceed most natural cut building stones. Cast stone is an excellent replacement for natural cut limestone, brownstone, sandstone, bluestone, granite, slate, coral rock, travertine and other natural building stones.

== Engineered stone ==
Engineered stone is the latest development of artificial stone. A mix of marble or quartz powder, resin, and pigment is cast using vacuum oscillation to form blocks. Slabs are then produced by cutting, grinding, and polishing. Some factories have developed a special, low-viscosity, high-strength polyester resin to improve hardness, strength, and gloss and to reduce water absorption.

Engineered marbles are most commonly used as flooring for large commercial projects, but unlike terrazzo are not cast on site. Engineered quartz is widely used in the developed world for counter tops, window sills, and floor and wall coverings.

The vast majority of engineered stone companies are located in China, India, and its birthplace in Italy. One form invented in the early 1980s is Bretonstone.

== See also ==
- Types of concrete

== Bibliography ==
- Media related to Artificial stone at Wikimedia Commons
- George Ripley, ed., The American Cyclopædia: A Popular Dictionary of General Knowledge, 1873 s.v. 'concrete'
