= Maria Oliva Bonaldo =

Italian religious sister

Venerable Maria Oliva Bonaldo of the Mystical Body
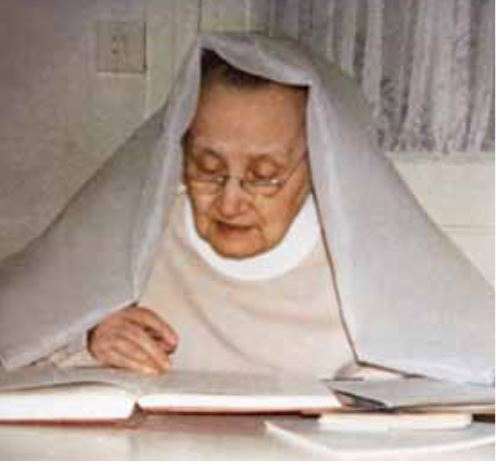
- Born: Maria Oliva Bonaldo; 26 March 1893; Castelfranco Veneto, Italy
- Died: 10 July 1976; Rome, Italy
- Canonized: 9 December 2013
- Influences: Igino Giordani; Giorgio La Pira

Maria Oliva Bonaldo, religious name Maria Oliva Bonaldo of the Mystical Body, (26 March 1893, Castelfranco Veneto – 10 July 1976, Rome) was an Italian religious sister in the Roman Catholic Church. The founder and Superior General of the Daughters of the Church was declared venerable by Pope Francis.

== Early life and education ==
Maria Oliva Bonaldo was born in 1893. Her parents were Giuseppe Antonio Bonaldo and Italica Dionisia Bianco. She was the fourth child of a family of nine. Her parents were first restaurateurs before they opened and operated a hotel in Bassano del Grappa where they settled. Her mother died on 13 February 1904, giving birth to her ninth child. Maria was 11 years old.

Bonaldo was educated in a school of the religious congregation of the Canossians until she was 14. Then, she went to school in Venice, where she obtained a teaching diploma in 1910.

== Teacher ==
Maria Oliva was sent to a primary school in Castello di Godego, Italy, for her first teaching assignment. She redistributed part of her salary to the poor, whom she called "Jesus," and began attending mass every morning.

In 1911, she became engaged to Mario Melli, a young Venetian painter.

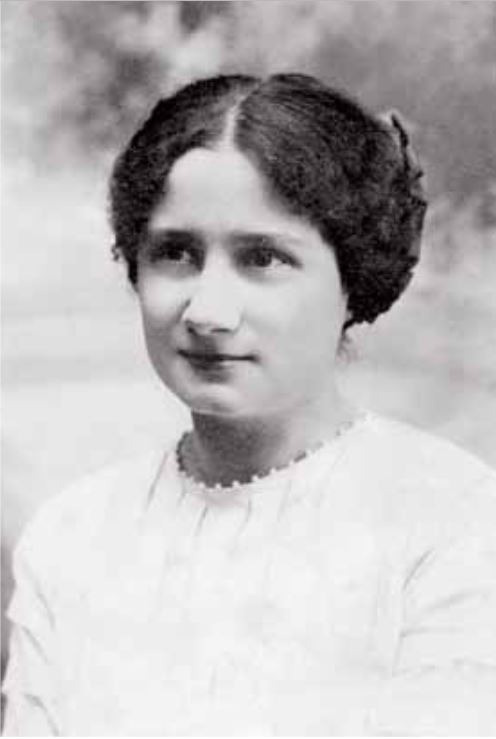
Bonaldo in 1913

On 22 May 1913, she decided to take part in the Eucharistic procession for the solemnity of the Feast of Corpus Christi. She would later describe this procession and the moment when the priest raised the host to give the blessing as the turning point in her life, considering at that moment that "everything that did not belong to God was vanity." She stated that upon returning home, she resolved to become a nun, and ended her relationship with Mario Melli. She informed her spiritual director of her new plan to become a nun, but he, surprised by this sudden and unexpected decision, dissuaded her from entering the orders immediately, not considering her ready.

During the First World War, Maria Oliva took refuge with her family in Portiolo, Italy, where she began serving Don Pericle Aldini, the local priest, and was active in youth ministry.

== Religious life ==
=== Canossians ===
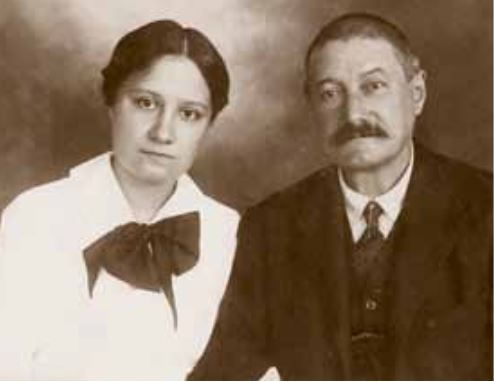
With her father, Giuseppe Bonaldo, shortly before entering the convent

In October 1920, at the age of 27, she joined the religious congregation of the Canossian Daughters of Charity in Treviso and took her religious vows on 24 October 1928. From 1924 to 1928, she attended the Università Cattolica del Sacro Cuore in Milan, and in 1930, she defended a thesis entitled "The Virgin in Humanism," which allowed her to graduate in literature and philosophy. She was then appointed director of the Pedagogical Institute of the Canossian congregation in Treviso.

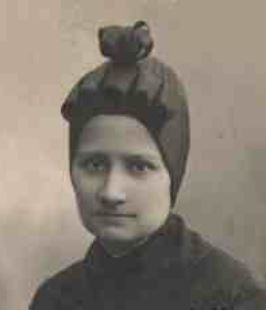
Bonaldo in the religious habit of the Canossian sisters

During these years within the Canossian congregation, she felt the need to serve the Church by promoting prayer and Eucharistic adoration. In 1934, she wrote the "33 Foglietti" (33 Pages), in which she developed the principles and physiognomy of what would later become the congregation of the daughters of the Church. Wishing to implement this project, she contacted Cardinal Adeodato Giovanni Piazza, Patriarch of Venice. On 24 June 1938, he authorized the creation of a "Daughters of the Church" community as a trial within the Canossian Daughters of Charity congregation. This first community was formed by Maria Oliva and four other nuns.

=== Daughters of the Church ===
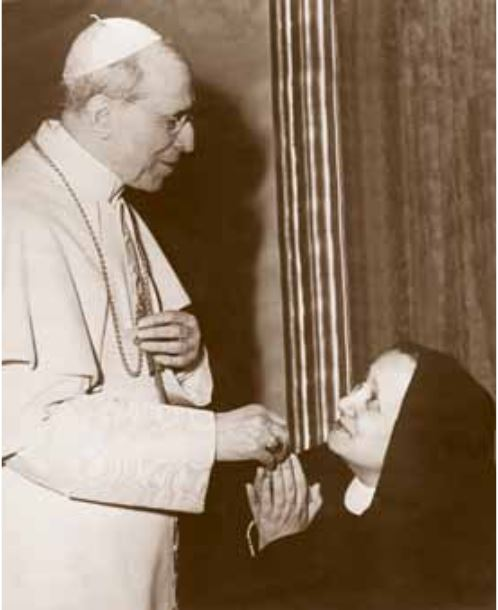
Meeting Pope Pius XII (23 March 1947)

On 21 April 1946, Cardinal Piazza gave his approval for the community of the Daughters of the Church to become a diocesan congregation (which received papal approval on 21 December 1949) and asked Pope Pius XII that Maria Oliva be released from her vow to remain a Canossian forever, to allow her to join the congregation she had founded. The Pope accepted. On 2 August 1946, in the church of Saint Maurice in Venice, Maria Oliva made her perpetual profession with 46 sisters within the congregation of the Daughters of the Church. She chose the name "Maria Oliva Bonaldo of the Mystical Body." She was elected Superior General of the congregation, a position she would hold until her death. Maria Oliva was called upon to serve as spiritual director. Among the people she followed were Igino Giordani and Giorgio La Pira, declared venerable by the Catholic Church.

== Death ==
On 7 July 1976, Maria Oliva suffered a stroke and died on 10 July. Her body rests in the chapel of the mother house of the Daughters of the Church in Rome.

== Beatification process ==
On 17 June 1987, Cardinal Ugo Poletti opened the cause for the beatification of Maria Oliva Bonaldo of the Mystical Body. On 9 December 2013, Pope Francis recognized her heroic virtue and declared her venerable.
