= Belluno railway station =

Railway station in Belluno, Italy

Belluno
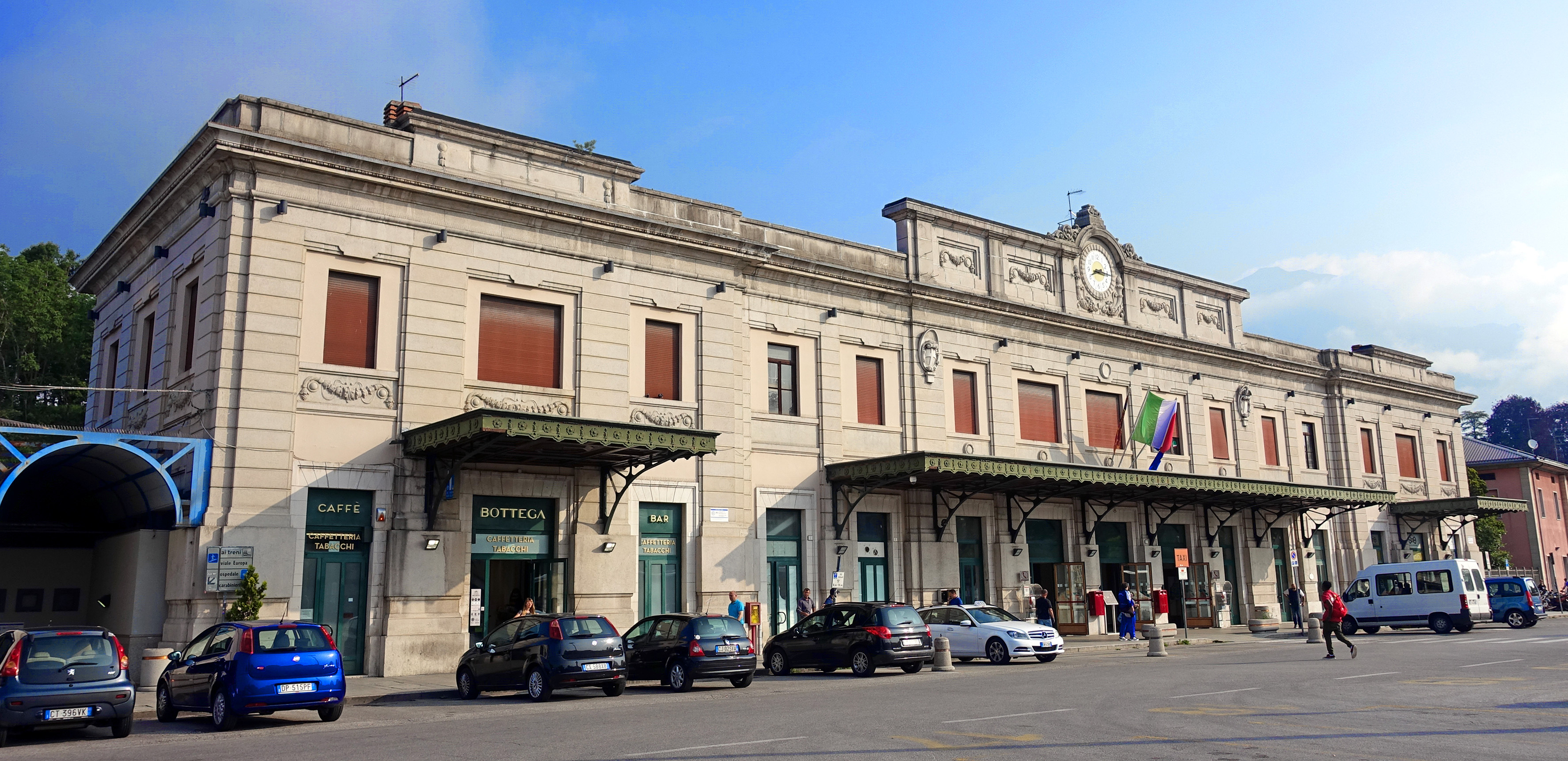
- View of the passenger building.

General information
- Location: Piazzale della Stazione; 32100 Belluno; Belluno, Belluno, Veneto; Italy
- Coordinates: 46°08′30″N 12°12′35″E
- Owner: Rete Ferroviaria Italiana
- Operator: Centostazioni
- Line: Calalzo–Padua
- Platforms: 4
- Train operators: Trenitalia
- Connections: Urban (DolomitiBus) and suburban buses

Construction
- Architect: Roberto Narducci

History
- Opened: 1912; 114 years ago
Location
- Location within Veneto Location within Northern Italy Location within Italy

Belluno railway station (Italian: Stazione di Belluno) serves the town and comune of Belluno, in the Veneto region, northeastern Italy. Opened in 1912, it forms part of the Calalzo–Padua railway.

The station is currently owned by Rete Ferroviaria Italiana (RFI). The commercial area of the passenger building is managed by Centostazioni. Train services to and from the station are regional trains operated by Trenitalia. Each of these companies is a subsidiary of Ferrovie dello Stato Italiane (FS), Italy's state-owned rail company.

== History ==
The first Belluno railway station, located in Piazza Cesare Battisti, was opened on 11 November 1886, on completion of the Belluno-Cornuda portion of the historical line Belluno–Montebelluna–Treviso.

The current station was opened in 1912, upon the activation of the first leg (up to Longarone) of the Calalzo–Padua railway. The passenger building, a project by the architect Roberto Narducci, was constructed in 1928.

== Features ==
There are four tracks running through the station. Three of them are equipped with platforms. Additionally, the station has three sidings for storing trains.

== Train services ==
The station has about one million passenger movements each year.

The station is served by the following services:

- Regional services (Treno regionale) Belluno - Conegliano - Venezia S. Lucia
- Regional services (Treno regionale) Montebelluna - Belluno
- Regional services (Treno regionale) Belluno - Ponte nelle Alpi-Polpet - Calalzo-Pieve di Cadore-Cortina
- Regional services (Treno regionale) Vicenza - Padua - Castelfranco Veneto - Montebelluna - Belluno - Ponte nelle Alpi-Polpet - Calalzo-Pieve di Cadore-Cortina

== Gallery ==
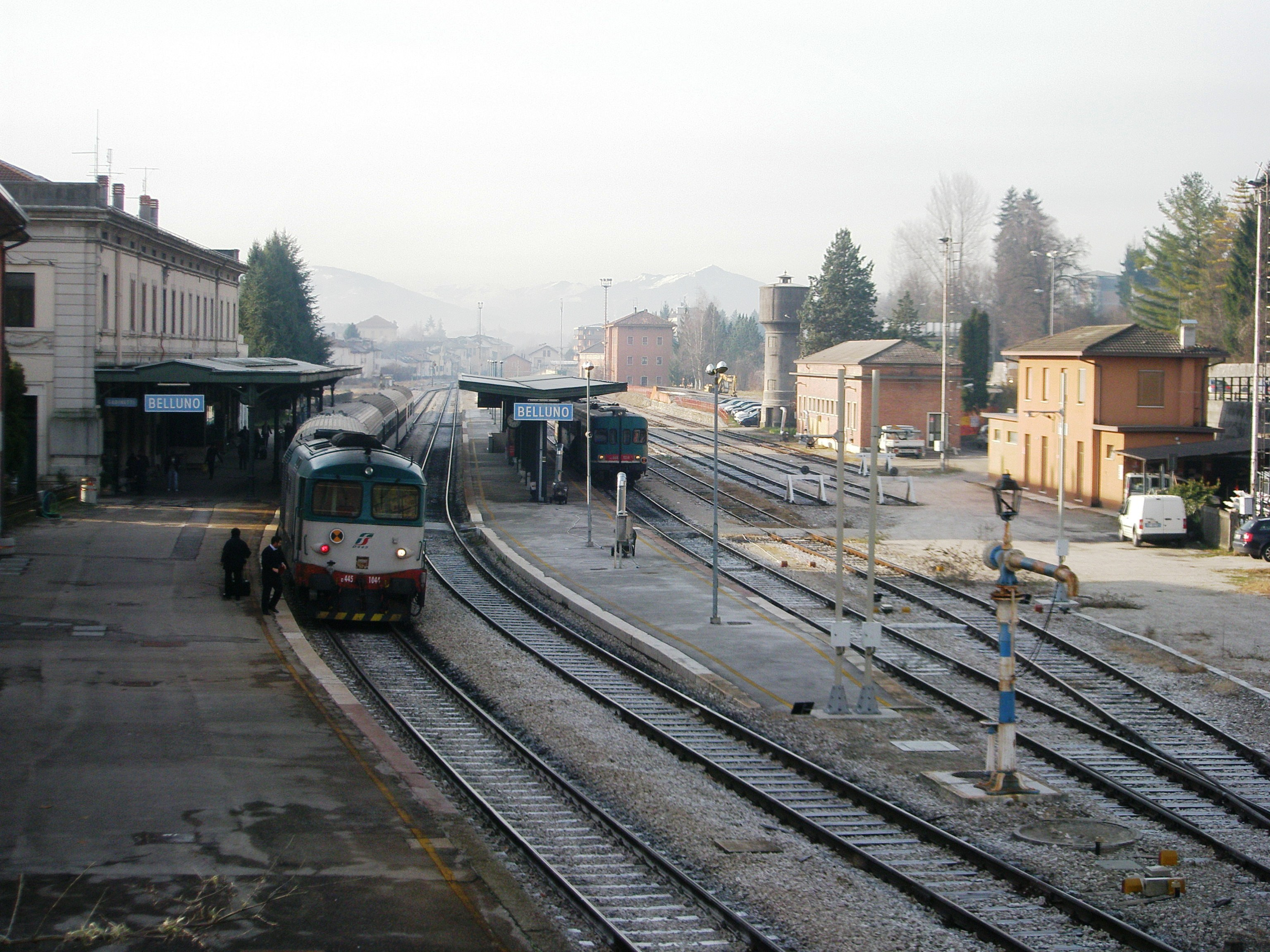
The station platforms and yard
