= Calalzo di Cadore =

- Comune
- Comune di Calalzo di Cadore
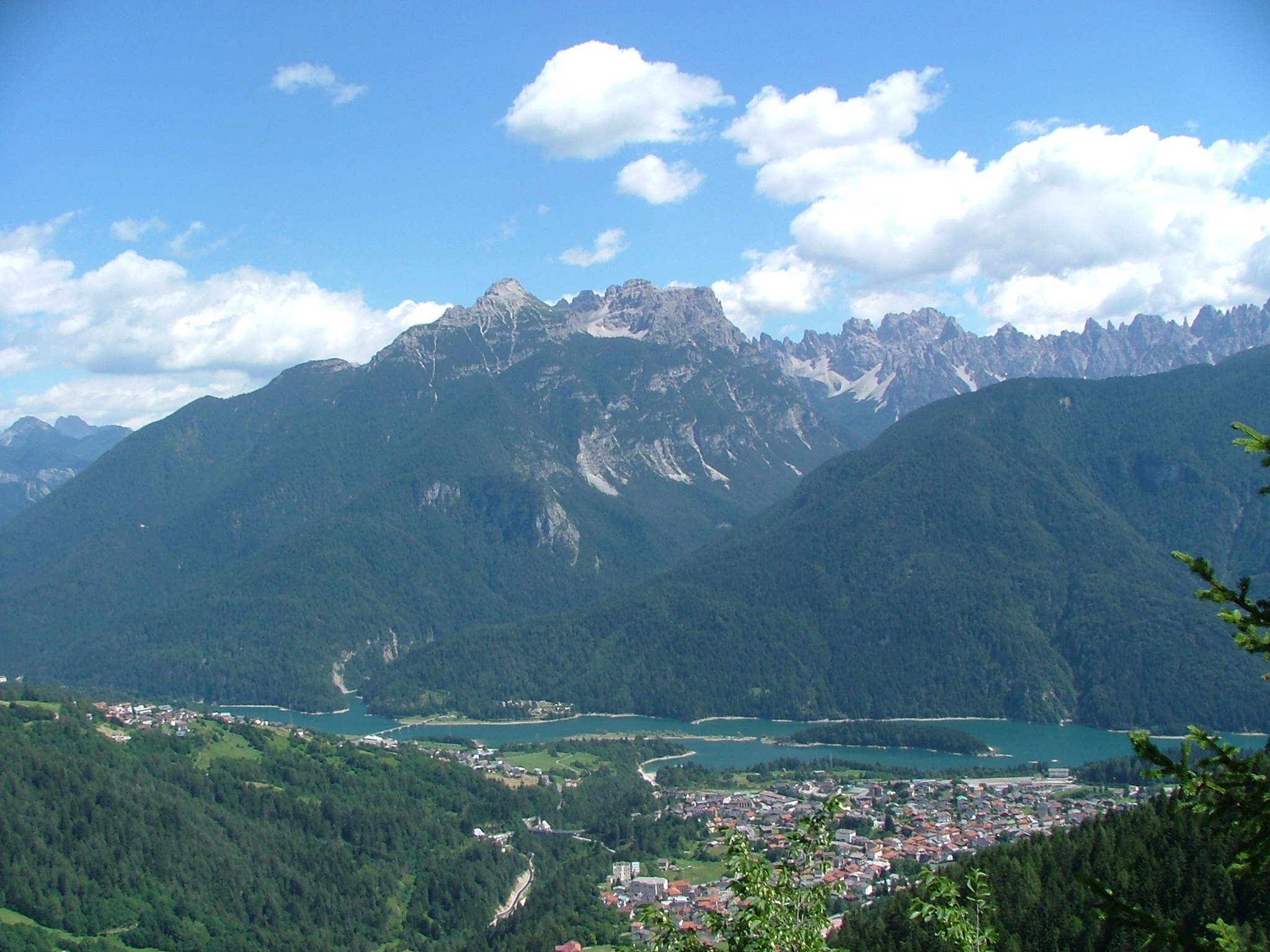
- Calalzo di Cadore and surrounding mountains

- Coat of arms

- Location within Italy Location within Veneto
- Coordinates: 46°27′N 12°23′E
- Country: Italy
- Region: Veneto
- Province: Belluno (BL)

Government
  - Mayor: Luca Fanton

Area
  - Total: 56 km^{2} (22 sq mi)
- Elevation: 806 m (2,644 ft)

Population (31 October 2025)
  - Total: 1,803
  - Density: 32/km^{2} (83/sq mi)
- Time zone: UTC+1 (CET)
  - Summer (DST): UTC+2 (CEST)
- Postal code: 32042
- Dialing code: 0435
- Patron saint: Saint Biagio
- Saint day: 3 February
- Website: Official website

Calalzo di Cadore is a municipality of approximately 1,800 inhabitants of the province of Belluno, in the Italian region of Veneto. The name Calalzo derives from the Latin altus callis, meaning "high place. The geographical name "di Cadore" was added by Presidential Decree on 30 June 1959.

== History ==
Calalzo, known as "Calaucio" in an ancient parchment, was part of the Hundred of Pieve di Cadore, seat of the Magnifica Comunità di Cadore. Its history and economy are closely linked to the fortunes of this territory.

Administrative documents in the municipal archive also show contracts for use (lease activities through "consortia") of lands owned by other municipalities even far from neighboring territories. For example, the purchase of forests and pastures in Ajarnola and Selvapiana in the municipality of Comelico Superiore. Since 1420, with the annexation of Cadore to Venice, the timber trade, through floating, was the main industry of the Cadore villages. With the fall of the Republic of Venice in 1797 and the dominion of France first, Austria later, also due to competition from countries within the Austro-Hungarian Empire, this activity underwent a decline that continued even after the annexation of Cadore to the Kingdom of Italy. Then began the phenomenon of emigration in Cadore.

There was, however, an event that would revolutionize the economy of this land over time when the eyewear industry began in Calalzo in 1877 by the brothers Angelo and Leone Frescura and Giovanni Lozza, natives of the hamlet of Rizzios. Calalzo di Cadore was also the birthplace of the novelist Pacifico Fiori, born in the municipality in 1898.

The municipal library Enrico De Lotto, inaugurated in 1986 in the presence of Mario Rigoni Stern, is equipped with 20,000 volumes. Parchment containing arbitrations, purchases, transactions, and awards dating back to the fourteenth century are preserved there, along with other documents. Two donations have found hospitality there: the entire library belonging to Enrico Pappacena, a professor of history of religions at the University of Bari, and numerous works, manuscripts, and documents of illustrious Calalzo residents.

== Geography ==
Calalzo lies within the Cadore Dolomites. The Dolomites are a range of limestone mountains in northeastern Italy. Nearby is a lake named Lago di Calalzo (Lake Calalzo), which is 12 kilometres (7 mi) long.

== Transport ==
The Calalzo-Pieve di Cadore-Cortina station, served by regional trains operated by Trenitalia under the service contract stipulated with the Veneto Region, is the northern terminus of the Calalzo-Padua railway. From the station square, a bus service run by Dolomitibus serves Cortina d'Ampezzo, Auronzo, Santo Stefano di Cadore, and Sappada.

== Sports ==
=== Cycling path ===
Calalzo is home to a cycling path lying on the old railway line of Calalzo-Cortina, built in 1915 to move supplies during World War I. It became a tourist path in 1930 and was suppressed in 1967. Today it extends from Calalzo to Dobbiaco. During the year 2004 it was sealed and generally improved with better lighting in the tunnels.

=== Giro d'Italia ===
The route of the 2013 Giro d'Italia passed through Calalzo di Cadore during Stage 11.
