= Pacifico Fiori =

Italian writer and journalist of the 20th century, renowned particularly as a novelist

- Born: 1898; Calalzo di Cadore, Italy
- Died: late 20th century
- Occupation: writer, journalist, playwright

Pacifico Fiori (1898 – late 20th century) was an Italian writer, journalist and playwright, renowned particularly as a novelist.

== Biography ==
Born in 1898 in Calalzo di Cadore, a small town in Italian region of Veneto, Fiori moved to Milan where he began his journalistic career in 1921, collaborating with the humor magazine Barbapedana (1921–1923), with Cacciatore Italiano (a periodical of which he was also the editor-in-chief until its closure) and, from 1924, with the satirical weekly Il Guerrin Meschino. In 1926, he joined the main Italian newspaper, Corriere della Sera, where he remained for nineteen years and then also wrote for the Corriere d'Informazione, la Domenica del Corriere, Corriere dei Piccoli, La Lettura (1937–1945), and Fantasie d'Italia.

In 1943, Fiori published his first detective novel, Colpa segreta, followed by Il filone d'oro and Lo smeraldo di Maria Antonietta in 1944. The following year, he released the novel La squadra fantasma, illustrated by Carlo Cossio, and in 1946, Entro il sei Marzo, published in the I romanzi dell'avventura series by Edizioni Alpe directed by Romualdo Natoli (previously published in 1943 in la Domenica del Corriere).

From the forties onwards, he was also prolific as a playwright. In 1946, he wrote the comedy La signorina No, awarded at the Milan Casa della cultura by Sabatino Lopez. In 1949, he published the farces Non c'è trucco! and La poltrona di Procuste, followed by the three-act comedy Non si sa mai, the comic opera Due schiaffi non-te li leva nessuno, and the detective comedy La banda della nebbia.

In 1951 for Carlo Signorelli Editore, he wrote the two volumes La storia del Far West (The History of the Far West) and La storia degli ammutinati del Bounty (The History of the Mutineers of the Bounty), with illustrations by Francesco Pescador, both published in the popular literature series directed by Gian Carlo Testoni. In 1955, he published the essay Sono innocente (I am Innocent) with Cappelli, which The Italian Scene in New York City listed in early 1956 among the most read books in Italy. Dedicated to the theme of judicial errors, the book addressed dozens of cases of wrongful convictions worldwide, from the case of the Little Baker of Venice, to the Gino Girolimoni case, from the Dreyfus affair to the story of Sacco and Vanzetti.

In the same year, he wrote the novel The Prairie Rebels, which earned him the Castello Prize and also had good international success: translated into English by H. E. Scott, it was published with illustrations by Nadir Quinto both in the United Kingdom in 1959 (The Prairie Rebels), and in the United States in 1960 (The Wild Horses of Tuscany), and then in South Africa in 1963 with translation by Marie Agostinis (Die rebelle van die grasvlakte). The book, set in the Tuscan Maremma, told the story of Pippo, Vanni, and Bicci and the three foals that had invaded their farm, while the Second World War was in its final stages. British critics described it as "a remarkable piece of literature providing a thoroughly enjoyable reading experience".

His Far West of 1964, published by Signorelli in different editions with different pagination, was republished by Rylee in 1969 in the United Kingdom, with translation by Susan Cannata. In 1963, Fiori published the short story collection A tu per tu con le belve (Face to Face with Beasts), included by Lina Sacchetti in her History of Literature for Youth from 1968.

A friend of Dino Buzzati, in his old age Fiori wrote the column The Secretary for Everyone for Domenica del Corriere directed by Guglielmo Zucconi, in which he answered readers' questions on various topics.

== Works ==
=== Literature ===
- Pacifico Fiori (1942). Novecento contro Duemila. Milan: Fratelli Crespi. Serial novel, in Corriere dei Piccoli.
- Pacifico Fiori (1943). Colpa segreta. Milan: Tip. Corriere della Sera.
- Pacifico Fiori (1944). Il filone d'oro. Milan: Tip. Corriere della Sera.
- Pacifico Fiori (1944). La città proibita. Milan: Tip. Corriere della Sera. In La Domenica del Corriere.
- Pacifico Fiori (1944). Lo smeraldo di Maria Antonietta. Milan: Tip. Corriere della Sera.
- Pacifico Fiori (1945). La squadra fantasma. Illustrated by Carlo Cossio. Milan: Editoriale sportiva.
- Pacifico Fiori (1945). Otto volante. Illustrated by Walter Molino. Milan: Tip. Corriere della Sera.
- Pacifico Fiori (1945). La maschera di silice. Milan: Tip. Corriere della Sera.
- Pacifico Fiori (1946). Entro il sei Marzo. Milan: Edizioni Alpe.
- Pacifico Fiori (1946). Titta, la scimmia e l'elefante. Milan: Àncora Editrice.
- Pacifico Fiori (1946). Una rosa al polo. Milan: Tip. Corriere della Sera.
- Pacifico Fiori (1950). Un elefante viene dal mare. Illustrated by Giorgio De Gaspari. Milan: Carlo Signorelli Editore.
- Pacifico Fiori (1951). La Storia del Far West. Illustrated by Francesco Pescador. Milan: Carlo Signorelli Editore.
- Pacifico Fiori (1951). La Storia degli Ammutinati del Bounty. Illustrated by Francesco Pescador. Milan: Carlo Signorelli Editore.
- Pacifico Fiori (1955). I ribelli della prateria. Illustrated by Guido Bertello. Turin: Società Editrice Internazionale.
- Pacifico Fiori (1963). A tu per tu con le belve. Turin: Società Editrice Internazionale.
- Pacifico Fiori (1964). Far West. Illustrated by Beniamino Bodini. Milan: Carlo Signorelli Editore.

=== Essays ===
- Pacifico Fiori (1955). Sono innocente. Errori giudiziari di tutti i paesi. Bologna: Cappelli.

=== Short stories ===
- Pacifico Fiori (1956). Il mistero di Maria Lafarge e del padrone della ferriera. Milan: Tip. Corriere della Sera.

=== Plays ===
- Pacifico Fiori (1946), La signorina No.
- Pacifico Fiori, Non si sa mai.
- Pacifico Fiori (1949). Due schiaffi non te li leva nessuno. Milan: Àncora Editrice.
- Pacifico Fiori (1949). La banda della nebbia. Milan: Àncora Editrice.
- Pacifico Fiori (1949). I corsari della Tortuga. Milan: Àncora Editrice.
- Pacifico Fiori (1949). Non c'è trucco!. Milan: Àncora Editrice.
- Pacifico Fiori (1949). La poltrona di Procuste. Milan: Àncora Editrice.

== Bibliography ==
- Glauco Licata (1976). Storia del Corriere della Sera. Rizzoli. p. 323. ISBN 9788817335003.
- Dino Buzzati (2014). Il giornale segreto. Corriere della Sera Foundation. ISBN 9788861267084.
