= Nicasius of Sicily =

Sicilian martyr of Catholic Church (c. 1135 – 1187)

Saint Nicasius
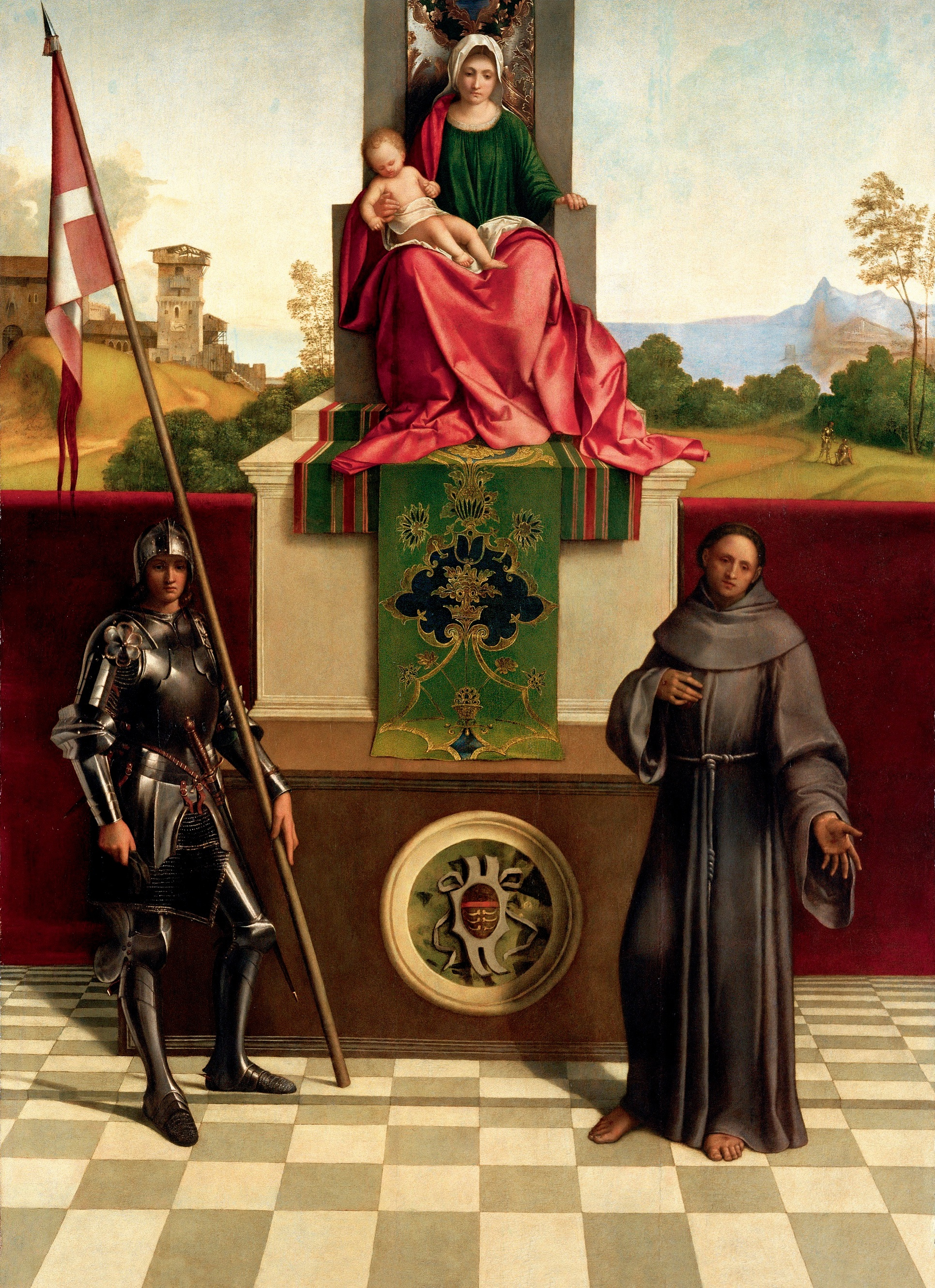
- Madonna and Child Between St. Francis and St. Nicasius (Castelfranco Madonna), ca. 1503.
- Born: ~1135; Sicily
- Died: 1187
- Venerated in: Roman Catholic Church
- Feast: July 1
- Attributes: Military attire
- Patronage: Caccamo; invoked against scrofula

Nicasius (Nicasio, Nicaise) of Sicily (also known as Nicasio Burgio, Nicasius de Burgo, Nicasio Camuto de Burgio, Nicasius Martyr, Nicasius of Jerusalem) (c. 1135 – 1187) is venerated as a martyr in the Catholic Church.

== Life ==
The son of Roberto de Burgio and his wife Aldegonda, Nicasius descended from the Saracens on his father's side and from the Normans on the mother's side. Born in Sicily -probably Palermo- to the Kameti (or Camuto) family (later known as de Burgio), he and his brother Ferrandino joined the Hospitaller Order of the Knights of St John of Jerusalem. As lay brothers, they took the religious vows of Poverty, Chastity and Obedience and a fourth “to stay in arms”, for the protection of the poor, and for the defense of the Christian territory of the Holy Land.

In 1185 they answered the call of Roger de Moulins and travelled to the Holy Land. There they served pilgrims and the sick in the hospital of St. John of Jerusalem.

Nicasius, a captain in the army, was captured during the battle of Hattin and decapitated in the presence of Saladin after refusing to convert to Islam.

Alternatively, another tradition claims that he assisted in the defense of Acre, but was captured and beheaded there in 1187.

== Veneration ==
An altar dedicated to him was extant in 1305 in the church of Saint Peter in Trapani. However, the point of origin for the veneration of Saint Nicasius seems to have been Caccamo –which officially declared him patron of the city on May 31, 1625. The priest Vincent Venuti in his Discorso storico-critico (1762) writes:"...now because of the dominions that the Burgio family had near Caccamo. Or because of devotion, which the Cabrera family exercised toward St. Nicasius, or because of both reasons, I figure that, little by little, some what of a cult toward our St Nicasius of Jerusalem, went in Caccamo…"

His feast day is July 1.
