= Breton (company) =

Italian machinery company

Breton S.p.A.
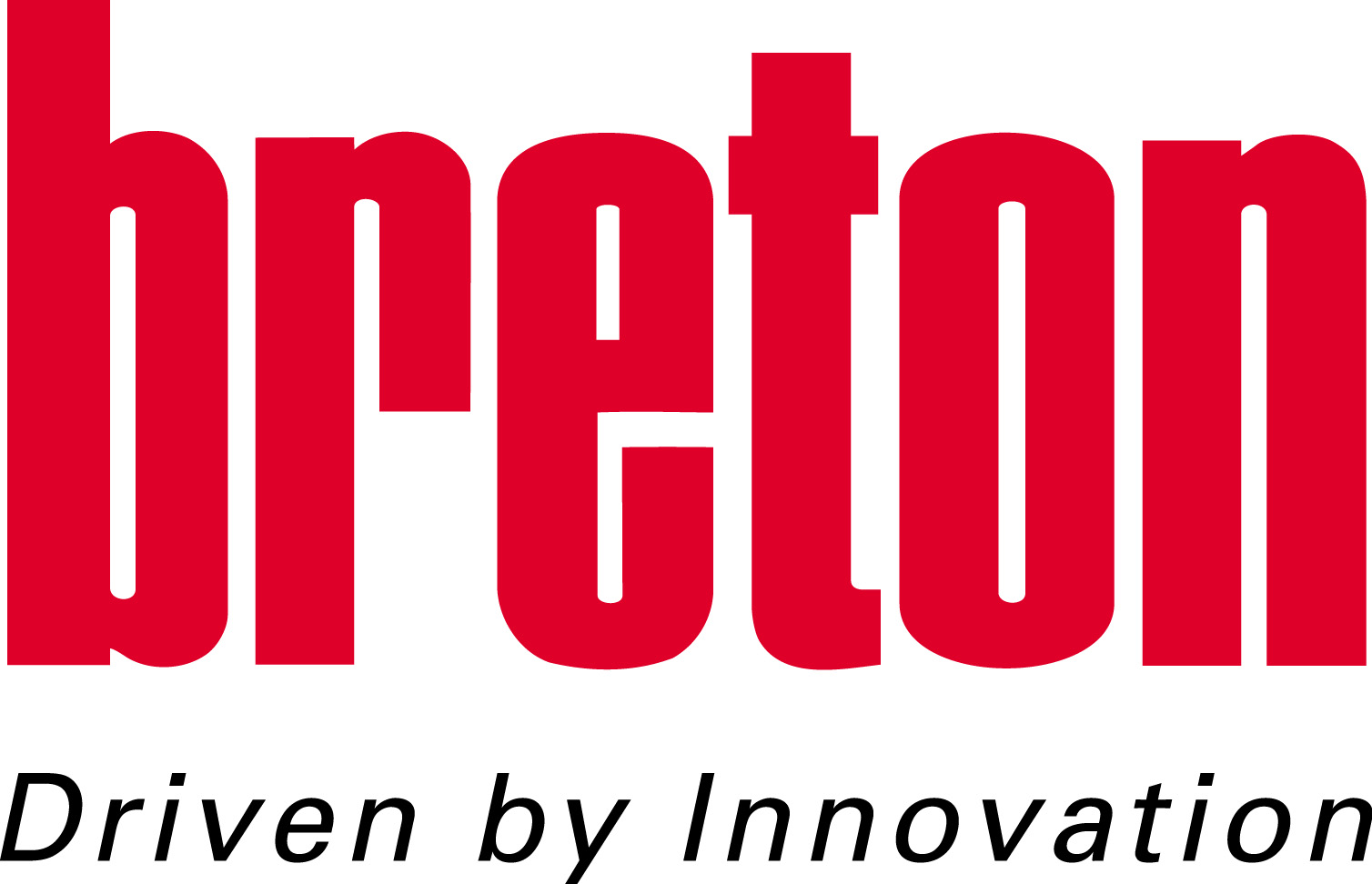
- Type: Private
- Industry: Manufacturing
- Founded: Castello di Godego, Italy (1963)
- Founder: Marcello Toncelli
- Headquarters: Castello di Godego, Italy
- Area served: Worldwide
- Products: plants for producing composite stone; machines for processing natural stone; machines for processing ceramic materials; cnc machining centres for high-speed machining
- Website: breton.it

Breton S.p.A. is an Italian, privately held company established in 1963 that produces machines and plants for engineered stone and metalworking. Machines and plants by Breton can be used in diverse sectors such as die-making, aerospace, automotive, racing cars, energy, gears, general mechanics, stone processing and kitchen top manufacturing.

== History ==
Breton was established in 1963 in Castello di Godego, Italy, by Marcello Toncelli, who started developing new technologies and manufacturing industrial plants for producing engineered stone. He invented Bretonstone technology, also known as vibrocompression under vacuum, a patented technology which is used today by engineered stone manufacturers. Around the mid-1990s, the company decided to expand into the machine tool market, manufacturing machining centres for the mechanical industry.

In 2003, Marcello Toncelli died, and the control of the company passed to his sons Luca and Dario Toncelli, who have been running the company since together with Roberto Chiavacci, Vice President of the board of directors.

In 2011, the company acquired Bidese Impianti and signed a partnership with Boart & Wire, a diamond wires manufacturer. In 2014, Breton became an official member of the Graphene Flagship Project, one of the largest research initiatives of the European Commission which focuses on the potential applications of graphene.

== Products ==
Breton manufactures machines and technology for following fields:

- engineered stone processing
- natural stone processing
- ceramic materials processing
- high-speed machining for aerospace, formula 1, automotive and die-mould sector

== Awards ==
Breton's solution to connect through the cloud to manage tele-service for 4,000 machines for hundreds of customers worldwide was awarded by Microsoft in 2012 with the Windows Embedded Partner Excellence Award for manufacturing.
