= Daughters of the Church =

Roman Catholic religious institute founded by Maria Oliva Bonaldo

The Daughters of the Church are a female religious institute of pontifical right: the sisters of the congregation use the post nominals E.F.

== History ==
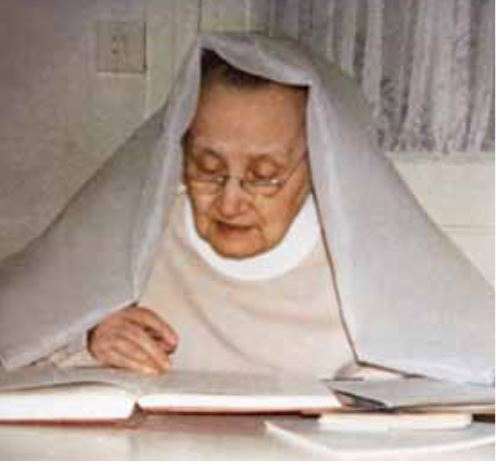
Maria Oliva Bonaldo, foundress of the congregation

The congregation was founded by Maria Oliva Bonaldo (1893–1976): in 1920 she entered the Canossian Sisters of Treviso and made her perpetual vows in 1928. Over the years she developed a vocation to the contemplative life and expressed her desire to Cardinal Adeodato Giovanni Piazza, who supported her project by allowing her and all her fellow nuns who wished to do so to experiment with this form of life.

Groups inspired by Bonaldo's charisma arose in Treviso and Vicenza: on 24 June 1938 the nuns, with the permission of the general chapter of the Daughters of Charity, met in Rome and began the foundation of a new congregation. The new institute, called the Daughters of the Church, officially began in Venice in 1940.

The institute obtained the pontifical decree of praise on 21 December 1949 and was definitively approved by the Holy See on 8 June 1957.

== Charism and membership ==
The nuns dedicate themselves to contemplative prayer, especially to adoration of the Blessed Sacrament, and prayer for the unity of Christians: they also dedicate themselves to active apostolates collaborating with the pastoral works of local churches and promoting the teaching of the church. In addition to Italy, they are also present in other European countries (France, Spain, Portugal, Turkey), in India and in South America (Bolivia, Brazil, Colombia, Ecuador): the general headquarters is in Rome.

As of 2017, the institute had 345 nuns in 65 houses.

== Bibliography ==
- Annuario Pontificio per l'anno 2007, Vatican Publishing House, Vatican City 2007. ISBN 978-88-209-7908-9.
- Guerrino Pelliccia e Giancarlo Rocca (curr.), Dizionario degli Istituti di Perfezione (10 voll.), Edizioni paoline, Milan 1974–2003.
