= Bretonstone =

Bretonstone press patent sketch
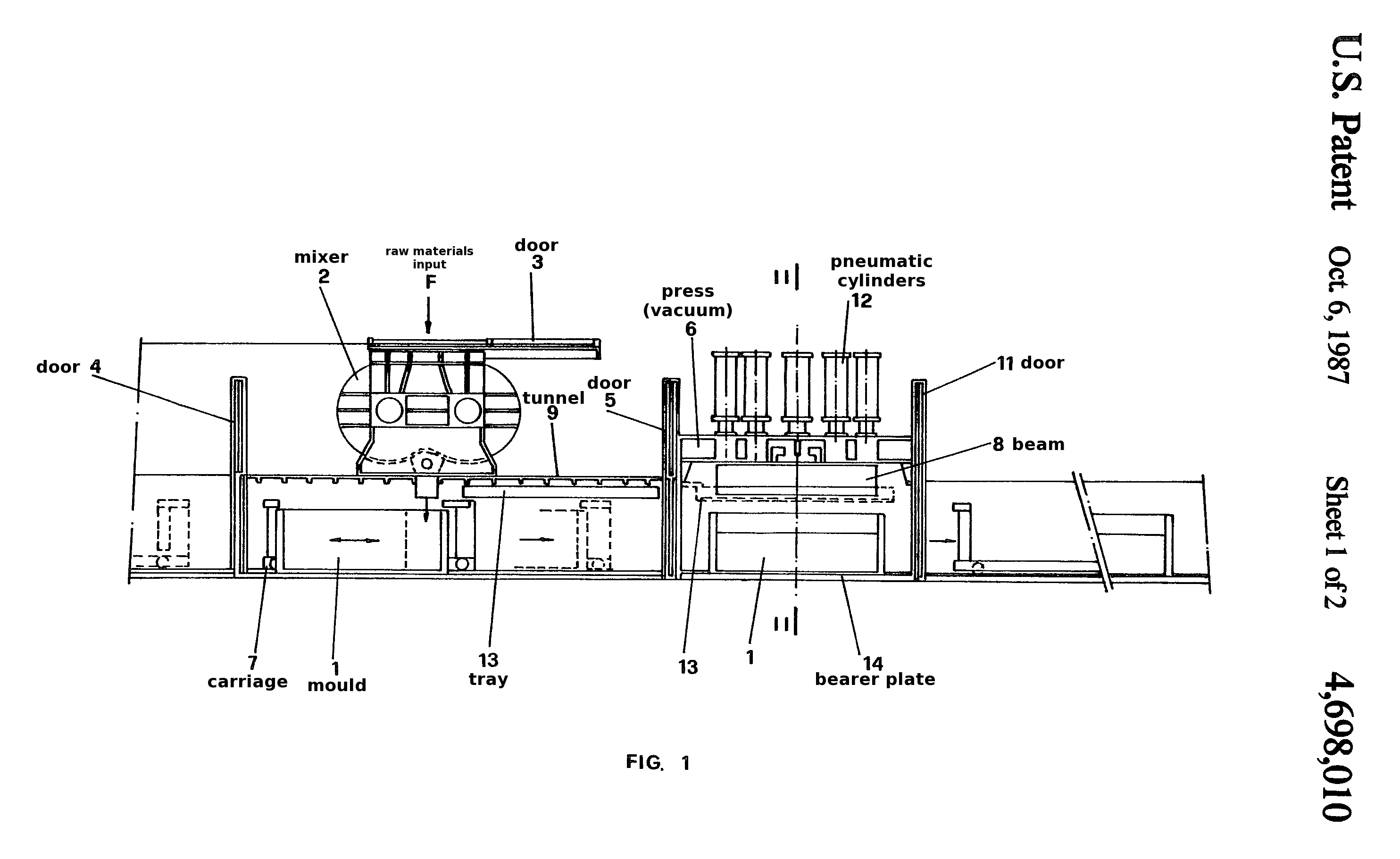
- Patent drawing for a press for vacuum vibro-compression.

Bretonstone, also known as vibro-compression under vacuum, is a formerly-patented technology invented in the early-1970s by Breton S.p.A.

Nowadays most manufacturers of engineered stone use similar technology, typically involving quartz and a resin binder combined under vacuum, and compressed under heat into a desired form such as a countertop slab.

== History ==
In the early-1970s Marcello Toncelli, founder of Breton, started developing the Bretonstone system, which allows to produce a solid surface similar to granite, using small stone aggregates and stone-like materials. The composite material is manufactured in slabs, which can be worked as natural stone, instead of blocks that should have been cut.

Basically the vibro-compression vacuum technology, used by Bretonstone system, consists of blending the natural aggregate of stone with a polymer mix (usually unsaturated polyester resin), taking away air with a vacuum, and catalyzing the molded product whilst vibrating and applying pressure to this mix. Then the mixture is heated, and the output is a slab of non-porous and quite stable engineered stone.

The following improvements led the agglomerated stone to obtain the same hardness as granite, when siliceous stone or quartz were added in the mix.

The agglomerate produced with the Bretonstone system looks like natural stone and varies in look according to the types of stone aggregates and stone-like materials used in the process. Some types of agglomerate are:

- granite-looking
- one-color
- veined marble
- exotic granite
- with colored glass inserts
- with crystal fragments
- with mirrors pieces
- with semi-precious stones
- with brass filings.
