= Pia Parolin =

Italian-German biologist, tropical ecologist, photographer and author

Pia Parolin (born 24 August 1965 in Italy) is an Italian-German biologist, tropical ecologist, photographer, and author. Her scientific work has focused on tropical forests and wetlands, especially Amazonian floodplains. Alongside her scientific career, she has published books on photography and has been active in street photography since 2016.

== Early life and education ==
Parolin was born in Northern Italy. German School of Milan. Study of biology at University of Bielefeld, Germany. PhD in ecology (1997), Max-Planck-Institute for Limnology and University of Hamburg, Germany, and Instituto Nacional de Pesquisas da Amazônia, INPA, Manaus, Brazil. Habilitation in ecology (2001), University of Hamburg, Germany.

== Scientific career ==
Parolin is a biologist and tropical ecologist whose work has focused on wetlands and tropical ecosystems, especially Amazonian floodplains. The Association for Tropical Biology and Conservation (ATBC) lists her as chair of its Conservation Committee and Photography Thematic Section. Member of the scientific advisory board of the Society for Tropical Ecology since 1995.

== Photography ==
Parolin has worked in street and conceptual photography since 2016. She is a member of the German Society for Photography (DGPh). Leica Welt has listed her as a speaker and workshop leader for photography events.

In 2024, the Italian magazine Fotocult listed Parolin among influential Italian photographers.

FotoTV featured her in repeated live sessions.

== Publications ==
Parolin is the author or co-author of several photography books, including works published by dpunkt.verlag and Éditions Baie des Anges.

=== Selected books ===
- Promenade(s). Rencontres éphémères de passants (Éditions Baie des Anges, 2018)
- Un dimanche matin à Nice (Éditions Baie des Anges, 2019)
- Flow – Fotografieren als Glückserlebnis (dpunkt.verlag, 2020)
- Entwickle deine Fotografie! Eine Wahrnehmungsschule für die Streetfotografie (dpunkt.verlag, 2021)
- Mit offenen Augen. Wie du deine künstlerischen Ansprüche verwirklichst (with Siegfried Hansen, dpunkt.verlag, 2021)
- Next Level Streetfotografie. Starke Bilder gestalten und klare Aussagen treffen (with Martin U. Waltz, dpunkt.verlag, 2022)
- Praxisbuch Streetfotografie. Von der Szene zum Bild – wie kreative Streetfotos entstehen (with Siegfried Hansen, dpunkt.verlag, 2024)
