= Castelfranco Madonna =

Painting by Giorgione

Madonna and Child Between St. Francis and St. Nicasius
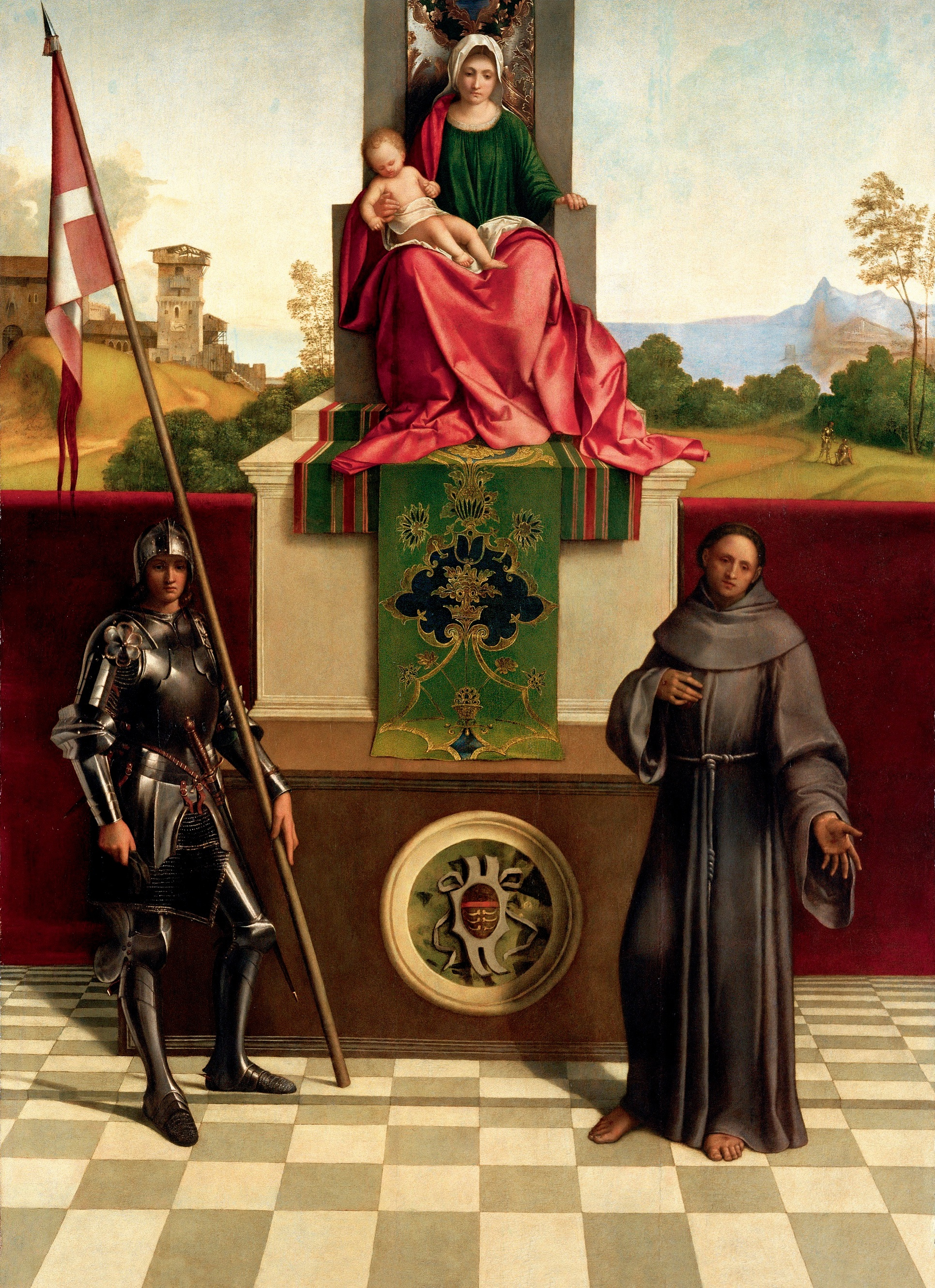
- Artist: Giorgione
- Year: c. 1503/04
- Medium: oil on panel
- Dimensions: 200.5 cm × 144.5 cm (78.9 in × 56.9 in)
- Location: Duomo of Castelfranco Veneto

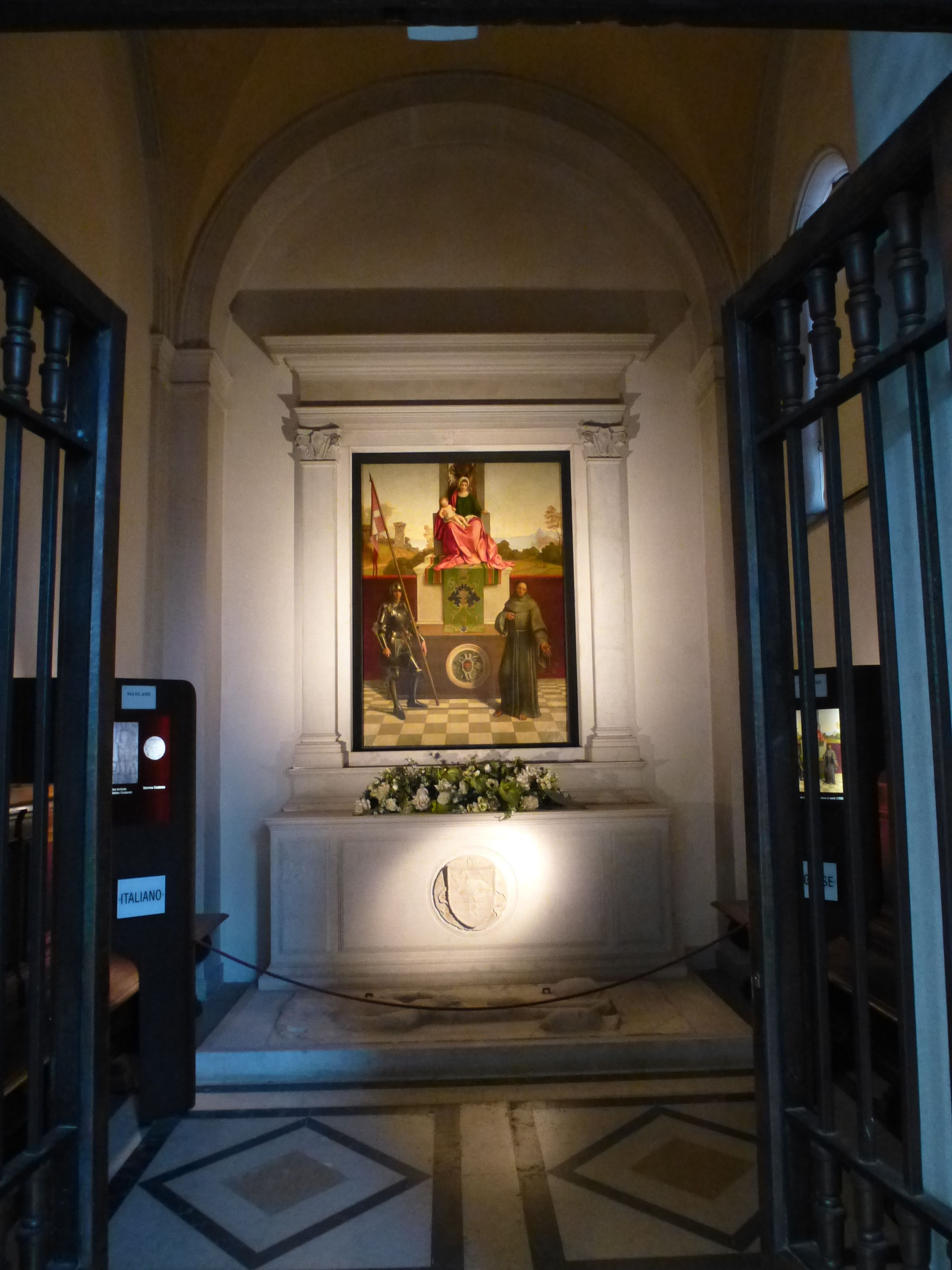
The painting in its setting

The Madonna and Child Between St. Francis and St. Nicasius, also known as Castelfranco Madonna or Pala di Castelfranco, is a painting by the Italian Renaissance artist Giorgione executed around 1504. It remains in the equivalent of its original setting, in a side-chapel of the Cathedral of Castelfranco Veneto, Giorgione's native city, in Veneto, northern Italy, although the present church dates to the 18th century.

The picture has all the elements of a typical sacra conversazione, with the Madonna enthroned with the child, with St. Francis to the right and St. Nicasius to the left. However, the extreme height of the throne is most unusual and creates a very different effect from the pictures of this type by Giovanni Bellini and other painters, where the throne is only slightly raised and the figures are at roughly the same level.

It is one of a handful of paintings - perhaps three - which can be very firmly attributed to Giorgione.

== Description ==
The armoured figure has formerly been identified as the fighting Saint St. George or St. Liberalis, patron of Castelfranco. Matteo and his brother Bruto Muzio were members of the Knights of Rhodes, whose ensign is borne by St. Nicasius (a martyred saint who had also belonged to the Hospitallier order). The traditional scheme of composition is lightened by the novel use of such elements as the throne and the landscape, which takes up a good portion of the background. Noteworthy is also the absence of any reference to ecclesiastical elements of architecture.

The technique of painting is an example of what Vasari called pittura senza disegno (painting without drawing). This was a new approach to painting which revolutionised the Venetian school and is famously used in The Tempest. Titian, a pupil of Giorgione, later became one of the most important exponents of this style. The figure of St. Francis is very similar to that in Giovanni Bellini's San Giobbe Altarpiece (c. 1487).

== History ==
The altarpiece was commissioned by the condottiero Tuzio Costanzo in memory of his son Matteo, who died of a fever whilst serving the Republic of Venice, in 1499. Also commissioned was a family chapel, containing the tombs of Matteo and Tuzio, built into the walls on either side of the painting. The church was subsequently demolished and replaced with the Cathedral of Castelfranco in 1724. The new building, which remains today, contains a small chapel housing the painting and the tomb of Matteo directly below. The Costanzo coat of arms, three pairs of ribs, can be seen on the tomb on the base of the Virgin's throne. (Some scholars have speculated that St. Nicasius himself is actually a portrait of Matteo.)

The work has suffered bad restorations in the past centuries, and was stolen on December 10, 1972. After being recovered, it was accurately restored in 2002-2003 by the Accademia Laboratories in Venice and displayed in the major exhibition Le maraviglie dell'arte, before being returned to its home in Castelfranco in December 2005.
