= Castello di Godego =

- Comune
- Comune di Castello di Godego
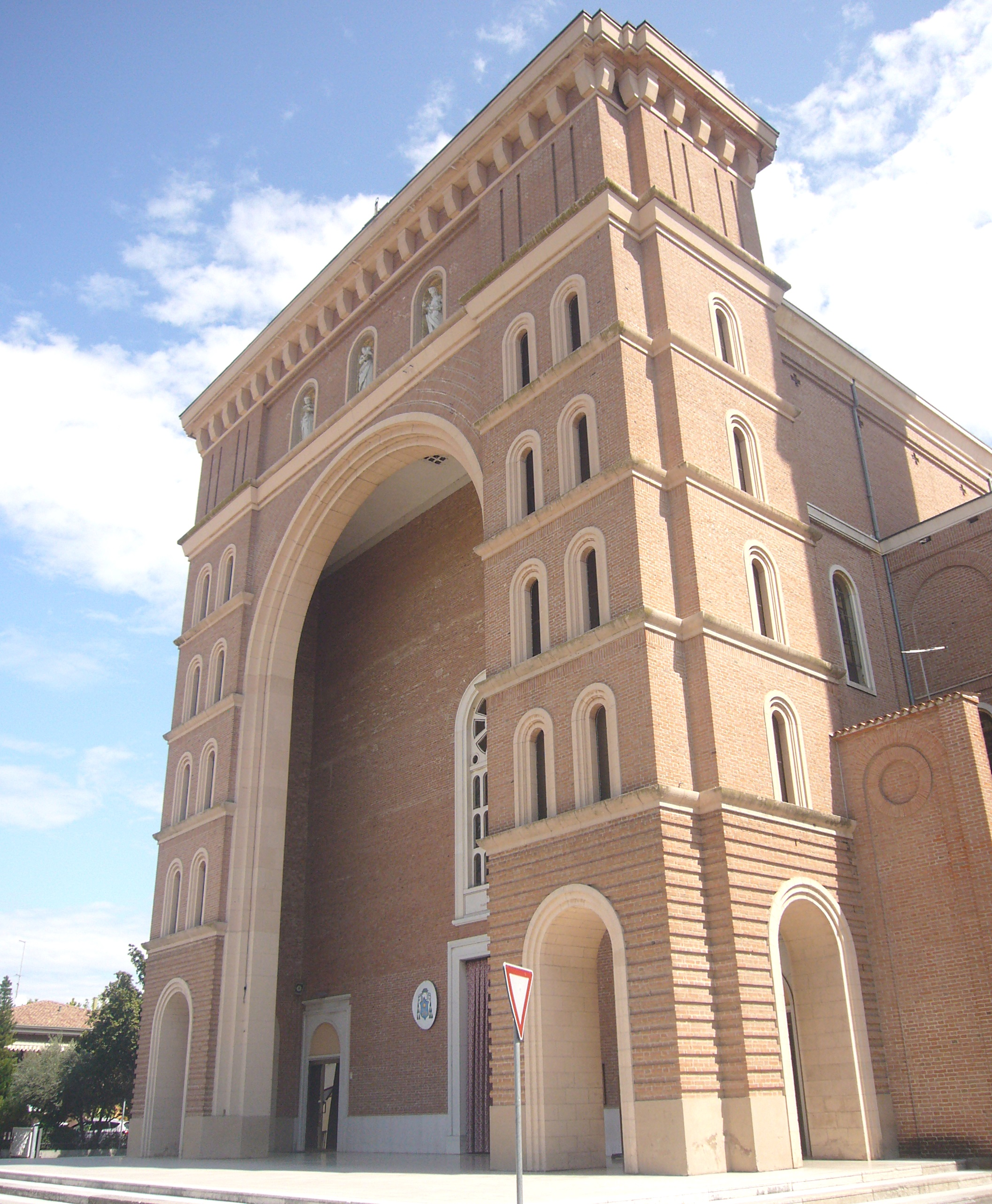
- Natività di Maria Santissima parish church

- Coat of arms

- Location of Castello di Godego in Italy Castello di Godego (Veneto)
- Coordinates: 45°42′N 11°53′E
- Country: Italy
- Region: Veneto
- Province: Treviso (TV)
- Frazioni: Località: Alberone, Avenali, Ca' Leoncino, Casoname, Chioggia, Motte, Quartiere Muson, San Pietro, Vegre, Madonna, i Prai

Government
  - Mayor: Diego Parisotto

Area
  - Total: 17.98 km^{2} (6.94 sq mi)
- Elevation: 51 m (167 ft)

Population (31 December 2010)
  - Total: 7,102
  - Density: 395.0/km^{2} (1,023/sq mi)
- Demonym: Godigesi
- Time zone: UTC+1 (CET)
  - Summer (DST): UTC+2 (CEST)
- Postal code: 31030
- Dialing code: 0423
- ISTAT code: 026013
- Patron saint: Nativity of Mary
- Saint day: 8 September
- Website: Official website

Castello di Godego is a town and comune with 6,329 inhabitants in the province of Treviso, Italy, Veneto region.

== Historic sites ==
The remains of the ancient town of Le Motte are on the boundaries with San Martino di Lupari.

Close to the Muson River is one of the area's oldest Catholic churches, San Pietro (4th century BC).

== Economy ==
Aside from agriculture, the most important activities are related to the food sector (Jolly) and the metal and stone machinery sector (Breton S.p.A.).

== Twin towns ==
- Boves, Italy
- Labastide-Saint-Pierre, France
