= Calalzo–Padua railway =

Railway line in Veneto, Italy

Overview
- Status: in use
- Owner: RFI
- Locale: Veneto, Italy
- Termini: Calalzo di Cadore; Padua

Service
- Type: Heavy rail
- Operator(s): Trenitalia

History
- Opened: 1914

Technical
- Line length: 155 km (96 mi)
- Track gauge: 1,435 mm (4 ft 8 1/2 in) standard gauge

The Calalzo–Padua railway is a railway line in Veneto, Italy.

The section from Camposampiero to Padua was opened in 1877 as a part of the Bassano–Padua railway. In 1886 it followed the section from Belluno to Camposampiero. The final section to Calalzo di Cadore was finished in 1914.

== See also ==
- List of railway lines in Italy
